is a 1987 Japanese animated science fiction film written and directed by Hiroyuki Yamaga, co-produced by Hiroaki Inoue and Hiroyuki Sueyoshi, and planned by Toshio Okada and Shigeru Watanabe. Ryuichi Sakamoto, later to share the Academy Award for the soundtrack to The Last Emperor, served as music director. The film's story takes place on an alternate world where a disengaged young man, Shirotsugh, inspired by an idealistic woman named Riquinni, volunteers to become the first astronaut, a decision that draws them into both public and personal conflict. The film was the debut work of anime studio Gainax, whose later television and movie series Neon Genesis Evangelion would achieve international recognition, and was the first anime produced by toy and game manufacturer Bandai, eventually to become one of Japan's top anime video companies.

Yamaga and Okada had become known through making amateur fan-oriented short films, particularly the Daicon III and IV Opening Animations, but their pitch for Royal Space Force argued that growing the anime industry required a shift away from works that pleased fans on a surface level but reinforced their isolation, advocating instead for a different type of anime that attempted to engage with fans as human beings who shared in the alienation issues of a larger society. The making of Royal Space Force involved a collaborative year-long design process using many creators, including some from outside the anime industry, to construct an elaborately detailed alternate world described as neither utopian nor dystopian, but "an attempt to approve existence". Science fiction writer Ted Chiang, author of "Story of Your Life", the basis for the film Arrival, would later describe Royal Space Force as the single most impressive example of worldbuilding in books or film.

Royal Space Force collective approach to filmmaking, its deliberate rejection of established anime motifs, its visual complexity, and the general lack of professional experience among its staff were all factors in its chaotic production, while increasing uncertainty about the project led to what has been described as an attempt by its investors and producers to "fix" the film before release, imposing a late name change to The Wings of Honnêamise, and a lavish but deceptive publicity campaign that included misleading advertising as well as a staged premiere at Mann's Chinese Theatre on February 19, 1987. Although receiving some support among domestic anime fans and the industry upon its March 14, 1987 release in Japan by Toho subsidiary Toho-Towa, including praise from Hayao Miyazaki, and Mamoru Oshii, the film failed to make back its costs at the box office, but eventually became profitable through home video sales. Future Evangelion director Hideaki Anno would later describe the reception Royal Space Force received as having had a major impact on him both personally and as a creator.

Royal Space Force did not receive an English-language commercial release until 1994, when Bandai licensed the film to Manga Entertainment. A dubbed 35 mm version toured theaters in North America and the United Kingdom, during which time it received coverage in major newspapers but highly mixed reviews. Since the mid-1990s, it has received several English-language home video releases, and various historical surveys of anime have regarded the film more positively; Yamaga has stated his belief in retrospect that the elements which made Royal Space Force unsuccessful made possible the later successes of Studio Gainax.

Plot

In the Kingdom of Honnêamise— on a different, Earthlike world of mid-20th century technology— a young man named Shirotsugh Lhadatt recalls his middle-class upbringing and childhood dream to fly jets for the navy. His grades disqualifying him, Shirotsugh ended up instead joining the "Royal Space Force," a tiny unit with poor morale whose commander, General Khaidenn, dreams of human spaceflight, yet is barely capable of launching unmanned satellites. One night, Shirotsugh encounters a woman named Riquinni who is preaching in the red-light district. Riquinni Nonderaiko, who lives with a sullen little girl named Manna, surprises him by suggesting that humanity could find peace through space travel. Inspired, Shirotsugh volunteers for a last-ditch project to keep the Space Force from being disbanded: send the first astronaut into orbit.

Riquinni gives Shirotsugh scriptures to study, but becomes upset when he touches her and angry when he suggests she should "compromise" with God. Riquinni feels such compromise is to blame for the evils of the world, but Shirotsugh suggests it has made it easier to live in. The General arranges a shady deal to help finance his project, and tells a cheering crowd that the orbital capsule will be a "space warship". Soon after, Riquinni's cottage is foreclosed upon and demolished; not wishing to expose Manna— whose mother was constantly abused by her husband— to any more conflicts, she rejects the outraged Shirotsugh's offer to get her a lawyer. He begins to read Riquinni's scriptures, which assert that humanity is cursed to violence for having stolen fire.

A test explosion that kills the chief rocket engineer is suggested to be the work of radicals, and Shirotsugh confounds his friends by sympathizing with protestors who say the mission is a waste of federal funding. The launch site is suddenly moved to the Kingdom's southern border, which will assist in reaching orbit but is also adjacent to a territory occupied by their international rival, the distant Republic. The General learns to his shock that his superiors see the rocket only as a useful provocation; unknown to the Kingdom, the Republic plans to buy time to get their forces into position by assassinating Shirotsugh.

Increasingly disenchanted, Shirotsugh goes AWOL, giving his money to the homeless and joining Riquinni's ministry, but is troubled by Manna's continued silence and seeing the money Riquinni keeps. He turns away when she reads from her scriptures that one’s own efforts at truth and good will fail, and one can only pray. That night, he sexually assaults her; when he hesitates momentarily, she knocks him unconscious. Next morning, a repentant Shirotsugh is bewildered when Riquinni maintains he did nothing, apologizing for having hit “a wonderful person like you". Reuniting with his best friend Marty, Shirotsugh asks whether one might be the villain in one's own life's story, not its hero. Marty replies with the view that people exist because they serve purposes for one another. The Republic's assassin strikes— Shirotsugh attempts to flee, but eventually fights back, killing the assassin. The General confides in the wounded astronaut afterwards that he once wanted to be a historian and not a soldier, but found history harder to confront, because it taught him human nature would not change.

At the launch site, the crew finishes assembling the rocket even as both sides prepare for the expected attack. Without informing his superiors, the General decides to launch early by trimming safety procedures, to which Shirotsugh agrees. When the Republic's forces invade to seize the rocket by force, an evacuation is ordered, but Shirotsugh rallies the crew to proceed with the countdown. The combined ground-air assault ceases with the rocket's unexpected launch, and the Republic forces withdraw. From orbit, Shirotsugh makes a radio broadcast, uncertain if anyone is listening: although humans have brought ruin to each new frontier, he asks nevertheless to give thanks for this moment, praying for forgiveness and guidance. As the capsule crosses into the dayside, a montage of visions suggests Shirotsugh's childhood and the passage of history; far below, Riquinni, preaching where he first met her, is the only one to look up as the snow begins to fall, and the camera draws back, past the ship and its world, to the stars.

Cast

Production

It surpassed the budget records of Hayao Miyazaki's Castle of Cagliostro (1979) and Castle in the Sky (1986), and in turn its budget was surpassed a year later by Akira (1988).

Development

Royal Space Force developed out of an anime proposal presented to Shigeru Watanabe of Bandai in September 1984 by Hiroyuki Yamaga and Toshio Okada from Daicon Film, an amateur film studio active in the early 1980s associated with students at the Osaka University of Arts and science fiction fandom in the Kansai region. Okada had first met Watanabe in August 1983 at a convention for tokusatsu fans in Tokyo at which Daicon Film screened their live-action short The Return of Ultraman and ran a sales booth for Daicon's related fan merchandise company, General Products.  In a 1998 interview, Yamaga asserted that the success of the company was an impetus that led to the creation of Gainax and the Royal Space Force proposal, as Okada had co-founded General Products with Yasuhiro Takeda but Takeda was now managing it well on his own, leaving Okada to feel he had nothing to do. "I approached Okada, who was feeling a bit down. I was thinking every day about how [Daicon Film's] Sadamoto and Maeda are great geniuses. Of course, Anno is a genius, as is Akai. To have one genius in your group is incredible enough, but here we have four of them. I told [Okada] that he would be a fool not to take action. I said that we should do something. We had sacrificed quite a lot for the sake of our independent films as students--we had dropped out of school, we'd lost jobs. So there had always been a desire within us all to see those sacrifices pay off at some point." 

Watanabe had been involved with product planning for Bandai's "Real Hobby Series" figurines. The position had also led Watanabe into Bandai's then-new home video label Emotion, where he helped to develop Mamoru Oshii's  Dallos. Released at the end of 1983,  Dallos would become the first anime original video animation (OVA), an industry event later described as the beginning of a new "third medium" for anime beyond film or television, offering the prospect of "a medium in which [anime] could 'grow up,' allowing the more mature thematic experiments of creators". Okada and Yamaga's pitch to Watanabe had followed the recognition Daicon Film received earlier that year in Animage magazine through a special secondary Anime Grand Prix award given to their 8 mm short Daicon IV Opening Animation. Their September 1984 proposal gave the outline for an anime to be entitled Royal Space Force, to be produced under the heading of a new, professional studio to be named Gainax. The proposal listed five initial core staff for the anime. Four had been previously associated with Daicon Film: Yamaga was to be the anime's concept creator and director and Okada its producer,
Yoshiyuki Sadamoto its chief character designer, and Hideaki Anno its chief mechanical designer. The fifth, Kenichi Sonoda, listed as responsible for the anime's settei (model sheets, drawn up to give the key animators their guides as to how the objects and people to be animated should look) had previously assisted with product development at General Products.

Writing

The Royal Space Force proposal, subheaded "Project Intentions: A New Wave in a Time of Lost Collaborative Illusions," began with a self-analysis of "recent animation culture from the perspective of young people". At the time of the proposal, Yamaga was 22 years old and had directed the opening anime films for Japan's 1981 and 1983 national science fiction conventions, Daicon III and IV, which through their sale to fans on home video through General Products were themselves regarded as informal precursors of the OVA concept. At age 20 and while still in college, Yamaga had been chosen by the series director of the original Macross TV series, Noboru Ishiguro, to direct episode 9 of the show, "Miss Macross," as Ishiguro wished "to aim for a work that doesn’t fit the conventional sense of anime." Yamaga commented in a contemporary Animage article that it had taken him two months to create the storyboards for "Miss Macross" and wryly remarked he'd thus already used himself up doing so; the magazine noted however that the episode was well received, and judged the creative experiment a success.

Okada and Yamaga argued in their proposal for Royal Space Force that what prevented the anime industry from advancing beyond its current level was that it had fallen into a feedback loop with its audience, producing for them a "cul-de-sac" of cute and cool-looking anime content that had the effect of only further reinforcing the more negative and introverted tendencies of many fans, without making a real attempt to connect with them in a more fundamental and personal way:

"In modern society, which is so information-oriented, it becomes more and more difficult even for sensational works to really connect with people, and even so, those works get forgotten quickly. Moreover, this flood of superficial information has dissolved those values and dreams people could stand upon, especially among the young, who are left frustrated and anxious. It could be said that this is the root cause of the Peter Pan syndrome, that says, 'I don't want to be an adult' ... If you look at the psychology of anime fans today, they do interact with society, and they're trying to get along well in that society, but unfortunately, they don't have the ability. So as compensatory behavior, they relinquish themselves to mecha and cute young girls. However, because these are things that don't really exist—meaning, there's no interaction in reality happening between those things and the anime fans—they soon get frustrated, and then seek out the next [anime] that will stimulate them ... If you look into this situation, what these people really want, deep down, is to get along well with reality. And what we propose is to deliver the kind of project that will make people look again at the society around them and reassess it for themselves; where they will think, 'I shouldn't give up yet on reality.

The proposal described Royal Space Force as "a project to make anime fans reaffirm reality". Gainax asserted that the problem was not unique to anime fans, who were only "the most representative example" of the increasing tendency of younger people not to experience reality directly, but as mediated through "the informational world". "We live in a society mired in a perpetual state of information overload. And the feeling of being overwhelmed by the underwhelming isn't something limited to just young people, but everyone" ... "However, this doesn't mean that people want to live alone and without contact, but instead they want to establish a balance with the 'outside' that is psychologically comfortable for them." Yamaga and Okada believed that this sensibility among some fans explained why anime often combined plots that "symbolize modern politics or society" with characters whose age and appearance was "completely incongruent with reality". The Royal Space Force plan proposed to use the creative techniques of anime for a radically different aim, to make "the exact opposite of the 'cool,' castle-in-the-sky anime that is so prevalent these days ... It's on our earth now, in this world of ours now, that we feel it's time for a project that will declare there's still something valuable and meaningful in this world."

 "It is essential to pay close attention to the smallest design details of this world. It's because it is a completely different world that it must feel like reality. If you ask why such an approach—when the goal is to get anime fans to reaffirm their reality—it's because if you were to set this anime in our actual world to begin with, that's a place which right now they see as grubby and unappealing. By setting it in a completely different world, it becomes like a foreign film that attracts the attention of the audience. The objects of attraction are not mecha and cute girls, but ordinary customs and fashions. If normal things now look impressive and interesting because they've been seen through a different world, then we'll have achieved what we set out to do in the plan; we'll be able to express, 'Reality is much more interesting than you thought.

The September 1984 proposal for Royal Space Force was unusual for an anime pitch in that it described the setting and story, but never named the main characters. Okada and Yamaga requested that Maeda and Sadamoto prepare a set of over 30 "image sketches" in watercolor to support the written proposal, depicting the world to be designed for the anime. That same month, Watanabe brought the pitch to Bandai company president Makoto Yamashina, who himself represented a younger corporate generation; Yamashina's response to reading Gainax's proposal was, "I'm not sure what this is all about, but that's exactly why I like it." Yamashina would later state in an interview with the comics and animation criticism magazine Comic Box shortly before the film's release that this viewpoint represented a "grand experiment" by Bandai in producing original content over which they could have complete ownership, and a deliberate strategy that decided to give young artists freedom in creating that content: "I'm in the toy business, and I've always been of the mind that if I understand [the appeal of a product], it won't sell. The reason is the generation gap, which is profound. Honneamise just might hit the jackpot. If so, it will overturn all the assumptions we’ve had up till now. I didn't want them to make the kind of film that we could understand. Put another way, if it was a hit and I could understand why, it wouldn't be such a big deal. I did want it to be a hit, but from the start, I wasn't aiming for a Star Wars. In trying to make it a success, it had to be purely young people's ideas and concepts; we couldn't force them to compromise. We had to let them run free with it. In the big picture, they couldn't produce this on their own, and that's where we stepped in, and managed to bring it all this way. And in that respect, I believe it was a success."

Pilot film

"This was a project that made full use of all sorts of wiles. At the time, Hayao Miyazaki said, 'Bandai was fooled by Okada's proposal.' I was the first person at Bandai to be fooled (laughs). But no, that's not the case. I'm a simple person; I just wanted to try it because it looked interesting. Nobody thought that Bandai could make an original movie. There wasn't any know-how at all. But that's why I found it interesting. No, to be honest, there were moments when I thought, 'I can't do this.' But [Gainax]'s president, Okada, and the director, Yamaga, both thought strongly, 'I want to make anime professionally, and speak to the world.' Producer Hiroaki Inoue felt the same way, as did [Yasuhiro] Takeda ... I was about the same age, so I got into the flow of all those people's enthusiasm." —Shigeru Watanabe, 2004

Royal Space Force was initially planned as a 40-minute long OVA project, with a budget variously reported at 20 or 40 million yen; however, resistance elsewhere within Bandai to entering the filmmaking business resulted in the requirement that Gainax first submit a short "pilot film" version of Royal Space Force as a demo to determine if the project would be saleable. Work on the pilot film began in December 1984 as Yamaga and Okada moved from Osaka to Tokyo to set up Gainax's first studio in a rented space in the Takadanobaba neighborhood of Shinjuku. That same month, Gainax was officially registered as a corporation in  Sakai City, Osaka; founding Gainax board member Yasuhiro Takeda has remarked that the original plan was to disband Gainax as soon as Royal Space Force was completed; it was intended at first only as a temporary corporate entity needed to hold production funds from Bandai during the making of the anime.

The Royal Space Force pilot film was made by the same principal staff of Yamaga, Okada, Sadamoto, Anno, and Sonoda listed in the initial proposal, with the addition of Maeda as main personnel on layouts and settei; Sadamoto, Maeda, and Anno served as well among a crew of ten key animators that included Hiroyuki Kitakubo, Yuji Moriyama, Fumio Iida, and Masayuki. A further addition to the staff was co-producer Hiroaki Inoue, recruited as a founding member of Gainax by Okada. Inoue was active in the same Kansai-area science fiction fandom associated with Daicon Film, but had already been in the anime industry for several years, beginning at Tezuka Productions. Takeda noted that while a number of the other Royal Space Force personnel had worked on professional anime projects, none possessed Inoue's supervisory experience, or the contacts he had built in the process. Inoue would leave Gainax after their 1988–1989 Gunbuster, but continued in the industry and would later co-produce Satoshi Kon's 1997 debut film Perfect Blue.

In a 2004 interview, Shigeru Watanabe, by then a senior managing director and former president of Bandai Visual, who in later years had co-produced such films as Mamoru Oshii's Ghost in the Shell and Hiroyuki Okiura's Jin-Roh, reflected on his personal maneuvers to get Royal Space Force green-lit by Bandai's executive board, showing the pilot film to various people both inside and outside the company, including soliciting the views of Oshii and Miyazaki. As Bandai was already in the home video business, Watanabe reasoned that the strong video sales of Nausicaä of the Valley of the Wind, released the previous year, meant that Miyazaki's opinions would hold weight with Bandai's executives. Watanabe visited Miyazaki's then-studio Nibariki alone and spoke with the director for three hours, of which time, Watanabe joked, he got to speak for ten minutes. Miyazaki, who had worked with Hideaki Anno on Nausicaä, told him, "Anno and his friends are amateurs, but I think they're a little different," comparing the matter to amateurs having "a gorgeous bay window" versus having a foundation: "They feel like they can make the foundation, and maybe raise a new building. If necessary, you can give that advice to the Bandai board." Watanabe laughed that when he told the executives what Miyazaki had said, they approved the project.

In April 1985, Okada and Yamaga formally presented the finished pilot film to a board meeting at Bandai, together with a new set of concept paintings by Sadamoto. The four-minute pilot film began with a 40-second prelude sequence of still shots of Shirotsugh's early life accompanied by audio in Russian depicting a troubled Soviet space mission, followed by a shot of a rocket booster stage separating animated by Anno, leading into the main portion of the pilot, which depicts the story's basic narrative through a progression of animated scenes without dialogue or sound effects, set to the overture of Wagner's Die Meistersinger von Nürnberg. Okada addressed the board with a speech described as impassioned, speaking for an hour on Gainax's analysis of the anime industry, future market trends, and the desire of the young for "a work called Royal Space Force".  Bandai gave interim approval to Royal Space Force as their company's first independent video production; however, the decision to make the project as a theatrical film would be subject to review at the end of 1985, once Gainax had produced a complete storyboard and settei.

In a 2005 column for the online magazine Anime Style, editor and scriptwriter Yuichiro Oguro recalled seeing a video copy of the pilot film secretly circulating after its completion around the anime industry, where there was interest based on Sadamoto and Maeda's reputations as "the genius boys of Tokyo Zokei University". Oguro noted as differences from the later finished movie the pilot film's younger appearance of Shirotsugh and more bishōjo style of Riquinni, whose behavior in the pilot put him in mind of a Miyazaki heroine, as did the composition of the film itself. Yamaga, in a 2007 interview for the Blu-ray/DVD edition release, confirmed this impression about the pilot film and speculated on its consequences:

"It's clearly different from the complete version, and by using the modern saying, it's very Ghiblish ... Among the ambitious animators of those days, there was some sort of consensus that 'if we can create an animated movie that adults can watch, with decent content "for children" which director Hayao Miyazaki has, it will be a hit for sure.' The pilot version was also created under that consensus unconsciously. However, I figured it's not good to do so, and my movie making started from completely denying that consensus. Of course, if we had created this movie with the concept of the world similar to the pilot version, it would've had a balanced and stable style, and not only for staff, but also for sponsors, motion picture companies, and the media ... it would have been easier to grasp and express. But if we had done that, I don't think that any of the Gainax works after that would've been successful at all."

Screenplay

"The film was Gainax's call to the world, of how we would be. The story of the anime is explaining why we are making anime in the first place. The lift-off of the rocket was only a preview of our future, when we were saying to ourselves, 'Oh, we will do something!' But those feelings are mostly gone, just like memories, just like the person you were when you were young. It has almost gone away. But there is still the real thing, the film we made, that tells our story."—Toshio Okada, 1995

Following the presentation of the pilot film, Yamaga returned to his hometown of Niigata to begin to write the screenplay and draw up storyboards, using a coffeehouse in which to work, taking glances out the window. The opening scene of Royal Space Force, narrated by an older Shirotsugh considering his past, depicts a younger Shiro witnessing the takeoff of a jet from an aircraft carrier; the look of the scene is directly inspired by the winter damp and gloom of Niigata's coastline along the Sea of Japan. Yamaga envisioned the fictional Honnêamise kingdom where most of the events of Royal Space Force took place to have the scientific level of the 1950s combined with the atmosphere of America and Europe in the 1930s, but with characters who moved to a modern rhythm. The inspiration he sought to express in anime from Niigata was not the literal look of the city, but rather a sense of the size and feel of the city and its envrions, including its urban geography; the relationships between its old and new parts, and between its denser core and more open spaces.

In August 1985, six members of the Royal Space Force crew, Yamaga, Okada, Inoue, Sadamoto, and Anno from Gainax, accompanied by Shigeru Watanabe from Bandai, traveled to the United States for a research trip, studying postmodern architecture in New York City, aerospace history at the National Air and Space Museum in Washington, D.C., and witnessing a launch of the Space Shuttle Discovery at Kennedy Space Center in Florida. Documentary footage of the research trip was shot by Watanabe and incorporated into a promotional film released two weeks before the Japanese premiere of Royal Space Force. Yamaga made revisions to the script during the American research tour. While staying in the US, the group was surprised and amused to see an English-dubbed version of Macross showing on their hotel room TV, a series which Yamaga, Anno, and Sadamoto had all worked upon; the scenes were from a rerun of Robotech, which had completed its initial run on American television earlier that summer.

Noriaki Ikeda, winner of the 1986 Seiun Award for nonfiction, began a series of articles on the film's production that year for Animage. After watching a rough edit of the film, Ikeda wrote that Royal Space Force was an anime that reminded him of what the works of the American New Wave had brought to the live-action movies of Hollywood in the 1960s; perceiving in the film an effort by Gainax to create a work with their own sense of words and rhythm, employing natural body language, raw expressions, and timing, and an overall "texture" that made a closer approach to human realities. Reviewing the completed film five months later, Ikeda made extensive comment on the scriptwriting: "It's been some time since I've seen an original work that pays so much attention to dialogue, and features such subtle nuance," contrasting it to "the anime we're used to seeing these days, that scream their message at you." Ikeda remarked in particular on how supporting characters were given dialogue to speak that was independent of the main storyline, which gave a sense that they were real human beings, and how this was further expressed in scenes that managed to convey "dialogue without dialogue," such as the sequence in the rocket factory where characters are seen to converse although only music is heard on the audio track. Yamaga suggested the idea of a film as the creation of an auteur was in conflict with the goal of depicting of a truly realistic world. He asserted that particularly since in animation, unlike in live-action, whatever appears in a scene is considered to have been "intentional," his objective with Royal Space Force was to deliberately seek to erase directorial authorship of this kind from the film as much as possible through dialogue and scenes that were "meaningless" in a strict narrative sense, but were intended instead to add a dimension of depth existing behind the story.

In a roundtable discussion with the anime magazine OUT following the film's theatrical release, Yamaga remarked, "I wanted to taste the sense of liberation I could get if I recognized everything [about human nature] and included it," a view with which Okada had concurred, saying, "this is a film that acknowledges people in their every aspect". On the 2000 DVD commentary, Yamaga stated of the character relationships in Royal Space Force that "A critic once said that none of the characters in this film understand each other. That there's no communication between the characters. He was exactly right. The characters don't understand each other at all. But throughout the film, there are moments where there are glimpses of understandings between [Shirotsugh] and the other characters ... In reality, it's okay not to understand each other. People all live their individual lives—it's not necessary to feel the same way another feels. And in fact you will never understand anybody anyway. This is how I feel about the relationships I have with the people in my life."

Three years after his 1992 departure from Gainax, Okada reflected on the film's screenplay in an interview with Animerica: "Our goal at first was to make a very 'realistic' film. So we couldn’t have the kind of strong, dramatic construction you’d find in a Hollywood movie. [Royal Space Force] is an art film. And at the time, I thought that was very good, that this is something—an anime art film. But now when I look back, I realize ... this was a major motion picture. Bandai spent a lot of money on it. It was our big chance. Maybe if I’d given it a little stronger structure, and a little simpler story—change it a little, make it not so different—it could have met the mainstream." "I think the audience gets confused at three points in the film: the first scene, which is Shiro’s opening monologue, the rape scene, and the prayer from space. Why? The film needed a stronger structure. A little more. A few changes, and the audience would be able to follow Shiro's thoughts. But right now, they miss it, and that’s a weakness. It’s true that there will be ten or twenty percent of the audience who can follow it as is, and say, 'Oh, it's a great film! I can understand everything! ' But eighty percent of the audience is thinking, 'I lost Shiro’s thoughts two or three times, or maybe four or five.' Those are the kind of people who will say, 'The art is great, and the animation is very good, but the story—mmmm...'" Okada remarked however that the decentralized decision-making creative process at Gainax meant there were limits to how much control could be asserted through the script; Akai would later comment that "the staff were young and curious, not unlike the characters in the film. If you tried to control them too much, they would have just walked out."

Yamaga asserted that a "discrepancy between who [Riquinni] wanted to be and who she really was...is evident in her lifestyle and dialogue," and that "on the outside," she carries an image of Shiro as "'an extraordinary being who travels through space into this peaceful and heavenly place'... But deep down inside she knows the truth. She's not stupid." The director remarked that Riquinni's actions and dialogue in the film's controversial scenes of assault and the morning after reflect the dissonances present in both her self-image and her image of Shiro, and that the scene "was very difficult to explain to the staff" as well; that she is signaling her strength to go on living according to her beliefs, and without Shiro in her life any longer. "There's no simple explanation for that scene, but basically, I was depicting a human situation where two people are moving closer and closer, yet their relationship isn't progressing at all...[Shiro resorts] to violence in an attempt to close that gap, only to find that was also useless. The two of them never came to terms, never understood each other, even to the end of the movie. However, even though they never understood each other, they are in some way linked together..." Yamaga affirmed that the scene where Riquinni looks up from her farm labor at the jet overhead was meant to be a match with the young Shiro doing the same in the opening monologue, yet at the same time showing that she and Shiro lived their lives in different worlds. "Whereas [in the final scene] with the snow, it's actually touching her, so there is a small intimacy in that image. But the snow is very light—it melts the moment it falls. So then, are they touching, or aren't they touching? I wanted to depict an ambiguous relationship between them at the very end." "When there's a man and a woman in a film, you automatically think that there's going to be a romance between them, but I didn't mean for it to be that way. Looking back now, I realize that it's difficult to comprehend a story about a man and a woman without romance, but at the time I made this film, I felt that a relationship between a man and a woman did not have to be a romantic one."

Design

In May 1985, Gainax transferred their operations to another location in Takadanobaba that offered twice the space of their previous studio, where the existing staff gathered in friends and acquaintances to help visualize the setting of Royal Space Force. Among those joining the crew at this time were two of the film's most prolific world designers: Takashi Watabe, whose designs would include the train station, rocket factory, and Royal Space Force lecture hall and Yoichi Takizawa, whose contributions included the rocket launch gantry, space capsule simulator, and rocket engine test facility.

Yamaga decided that the vision of the alternate world depicted in the pilot film did not have the kind of different realism he was hoping to achieve in the completed work. Rather than use the design work of the pilot as a foundation for the full-length anime, it was decided to "destroy" the world of the pilot film and start over again, creating a new series of "image board" paintings to visualize the look of Royal Space Force. The total worldbuilding process went on for roughly a year, and was described as a converse process between Yamaga and the gradually assembled team of designers; expressing his ideas into concrete terms, but also bringing their concrete skills to bear toward the expression of abstract ideas. Yamaga reflected in 2007 that this reciprocal process influenced his writing on the film: "My style is not 'I have a story I created, so you help me make it.' Creators come first, and this is a story I created thinking what story those creators would shine at the most."

In the decade following Royal Space Force, the Sadamoto-designed Nadia La Arwall and Rei Ayanami would each twice win the Anime Grand Prix fan poll for favorite female character; Sadamoto's Shinji Ikari would also win twice for favorite male character. By contrast, his male and female leads designed for Royal Space Force, Shirotsugh and Riquinni, ranked ninth and twentieth respectively for their categories in the Grand Prix poll of 1987 releases. In a roundtable discussion on Royal Space Force following its release, it was pointed out that neither Shirotsugh nor Riquinni look like typical anime lead characters. Yamaga remarked in his 2007 retrospective that, "One of the changes you can easily see from the pilot version is the character modeling of the protagonist. He used to look like a boy, but has become like a middle-aged man. As you can see in Evangelion later on, characters that Yoshiyuki Sadamoto creates are more attractive when they look young. But of course, he's really skilled, so even if he challenges the area that's not his specialty, he can give us what we're asking for."

Sadamoto in fact did use for the final version of Shirotsugh a model reference significantly older than the 21-year old character's age, the American actor Treat Williams, although the character designer remarked that Yamaga's instructions to make the face square and the eyebrows thicker had him thinking the redesign would look like the director himself. As a reference for Manna, Yamaga referred Sadamoto to actress Tatum O'Neal as she appeared in the first half of the film Paper Moon. Takami Akai remarked that "Sadamoto drew Manna so perfectly that we were sort of intimidated," adding she was "a sidekick who brought out the darker aspects" of Riquinni. Regarding Riquinni herself, Sadamoto commented in 1987 that there seemed to be a model for her, but Yamaga did not tell him who it was. In a 2018 interview session with Niigata University, Yamaga remarked, "What I see now is surprisingly the character Riquinni is nothing but me. At any rate, Shirotsugh is not me. If you ask me where I  would position myself in the film, I would identify myself as Riquinni in many aspects, in terms of the way I think. I was probably someone weird [and] religious, ever since my childhood." The appearance of several minor characters in Royal Space Force was based on Gainax staff members or crew on the film, including Nekkerout (Takeshi Sawamura), the Republic aide who plans Shirotsugh's assassination (Fumio Iida), and the director who suggests what Shiro should say before he walks out of his TV interview (Hiroyuki Kitakubo).

Commenting on the character designs in Royal Space Force, Sadamoto remarked that in truth they more reflected the tastes of Gainax than his own personal ones, although at the same time, as the artist, his taste must be reflected in them somehow. Sadamoto discussed the issue in terms of anime character design versus manga character design: "Manga can afford such strong and weird characters, but it's difficult to make good moving characters out of them in anime. The moment I draw a character, for example, you can see how it is going to behave, really ... but I was asking myself what I should be doing. 'Should I make their facial expressions more like those you see in a typical anime?' and so on. I feel that the audience reaction was pretty good, or at least that I managed to get a passing grade."

On the premise that the real world itself was a product of mixed design, Yamaga believed that the sense of alternate reality in Royal Space Force would be strengthened by inviting as many designers as possible to participate in the anime.  By September, the worldbuilding of Royal Space Force proceeded forward by a system where designers were free to draw and submit visual concepts based on their interpretation of Yamaga's script; the concept art would then be discussed at a daily liaison meeting between Yamaga and the other staff. Yamaga used "keywords" given to the designers as a starting point for the film’s world building; the words were divided into what he termed "symbolic" and "non-symbolic" categories. The director sought to avoid "symbolic" premises where possible; as an example of the difference, Yamaga stated that a "symbolic" way to describe a "cup" would be to call it a "cylindrical object", whereas he preferred the designers start from "non-symbolic" terms that described a cup's function or sensory impressions from use, such as "it holds water," or "it’s cold and sweats when filled with water." Yamaga expressed a concern, however, that relying entirely on this "non-symbolic" approach would have risked making the designs into "abstract paintings," and so decided to retain a certain degree of "symbolic" information in the keywords.

Assistant director Shinji Higuchi had overall responsibility for coordinating the design work with Yamaga's intentions through overseeing the output of its multiple designers; Higuchi noted moreover that the film's main mecha were designed in a collaborative fashion, citing as an example the Honnêamise air force plane, for which Sadamoto first created a rough sketch, then Takizawa finished up its shape, with its final touches added by Anno. Although his aim was to give a unified look to the kingdom of Honnêamise as the film's main setting, Higuchi also attempted to take care to make it neither too integrated nor too disjointed, remarking that just as the present day world is made from a mixing of different cultures, this would have also been true of a past environment such as the alternate 1950s world of Honnêamise. Yamaga commented that the film also portrayed the idea that different levels of technology are present in a world at the same time depending upon particular paths of development, such as the color TV in use by the Republic, or the air combat between jet and prop planes at the end, which Yamaga compared to similar engagements during the Korean War.

A deliberate exception to Royal Space Force general design approach was the rocket itself, which was adapted from a real-world Soviet model. This exception was later noticed by Hayao Miyazaki, for whom it formed one of his two criticisms of the anime; he was surprised that a film which had gone so far as to change the shape of money did not make the rocket more unusual. Yamaga argued that although the anime reaches its eventual conclusion through a process of different design paths, it was necessary to end the film with a rocket inspired by reality, lest the audience see it as a story about a different world that has nothing to do with them. In their roundtable discussion with OUT, Gainax described the rocket as also emblematic of the film's approach to mecha; despite its many mecha designs, they all play supporting roles, and even the rocket is not treated as a "lead character".

Art direction

Although later noted for creating much of the aesthetic behind the influential 1995 film Ghost in the Shell, Hiromasa Ogura in a 2012 interview named his first project as an art director, Royal Space Force, as the top work of his career. Ogura had entered the anime industry in 1977 as a background painter at Kobayashi Production, where he contributed art to such films as Lupin III: The Castle of Cagliostro and Harmagedon. At the time work began on Royal Space Force, Ogura was at Studio Fuga, a backgrounds company he had co-founded in 1983; he related that it was his associate Yoshimi Asari of Triangle Staff who contacted him on behalf of Gainax, arranging for Okada and Inoue to come to Fuga and discuss their plans for the film. Ogura mentioned that although he did not know the details of how Asari came to suggest him for the job, he found out later that Gainax had previously approached his seniors Shichirō Kobayashi and Mukuo Takamura, who had been the art directors on Lupin III: The Castle of Cagliostro and Harmagedon respectively, but that both had passed on Royal Space Force.

After joining the Royal Space Force team on temporary loan from Studio Fuga, Ogura worked in the film's pre-production studio in Takadanobaba. He later joked that his initial reaction to Gainax was "What's up with these people?", remarking that they acted like a bunch of students who all knew each other, whereas he had no idea who any of them were. Although Ogura recalled that he had seen the Daicon opening animation films before starting Fuga and had been impressed that amateurs had made them, he did not realize at first that he was now working with the same people, laughing that he likewise eventually recognized Anno from having seen his role in The Return of Ultraman. After the completion of Royal Space Force, Ogura went to work on his first collaboration with Mamoru Oshii,  Twilight Q: Mystery Case File 538, but would later collaborate with Gainax again as art director of the final episodes of the 1990-91 TV series Nadia: The Secret of Blue Water and of the 2000-01 OVA series FLCL, which Ogura personally ranked alongside his work on the Patlabor films and Jin-Roh: The Wolf Brigade, praising the unique world sense of FLCL series director Kazuya Tsurumaki and animator, designer, and layout artist Hiroyuki Imaishi.

Ogura oversaw a team of 16 background painters on Royal Space Force, including the future art director of Princess Mononoke, Spirited Away, and The Wind Rises, Yōji Takeshige. At the time of Royal Space Force production, Takeshige was still a student attending Tama Art University; the following year he would join Studio Ghibli to create backgrounds for 1988's My Neighbor Totoro. Ogura remarked that many of his team were veterans of Sanrio's theatrical films unit, which gave him confidence in their abilities; mentioning that one former Sanrio artist, future Gankutsuou art director Hiroshi Sasaki, created the images for Royal Space Force'''s final sequence. More than half of the background paintings for the film were made on site at Gainax, rather than assigning the task to staff working externally, as Ogura felt the worldview and details of the film's aesthetic were easier for him to communicate to artists in person, giving as an example the color subtleties; as the color scheme in Royal Space Force was subdued, if a painting needed more of a bluish cast to it, he couldn't simply instruct the artist to "add more blue."

Toshio Okada described the appearance of the world in which Royal Space Force takes place as having been shaped in stages by three main artists: first, its major color elements (blue and brown) were determined by Sadamoto; then its architectural styles and artistic outlook were designed by [Takashi] Watabe, and finally Ogura gave it "a sense of life" through depicting its light, shadow, and air. It was noted also that the film's world displays different layers of time in its designs; the main motifs being Art Deco, but with older Art Nouveau and newer postmodern elements also present. Yamaga expressed the view that Ogura being a Tokyo native allowed him to do a good job on the film's city scenes, yet Ogura himself described the task as difficult; while he attempted to sketch out as much of the city as possible, its urban aesthetic was so cluttered that it was difficult for him to determine vanishing point and perspective. Ogura commented that although the film depicted a different world, "there's nothing that you'd call sci-fi stuff, it's everyday, normal life like our own surroundings. I wanted to express that messy impression." As art director, he also laid particular emphasis on attempting to convey the visual texture of the world's architecture and interior design, remarking that he was amazed at how Watabe's original drawings of buildings contained detailed notes on the structural and decorative materials used in them, inspiring Ogura to then express in his paintings such aspects as the woodwork motifs prominent in the Royal Space Force headquarters, or by contrast the metallic elements in the room where the Republic minister Nereddon tastes wine. Watabe and Ogura would collaborate again in 1995 on constructing the cityscapes of Ghost in the Shell.

Ogura theorized that the background paintings in Royal Space Force were a result not only of the effort put into the film, but the philosophy behind the effort: "I think this shows what you can make if you take animation seriously. [Yamaga] often said he wanted to dispense with the usual symbolic bits. It isn't about saying that because it's evening, the colors should be signified in this way. Not every sunset is the same." Critiquing his own work, Ogura wished that he had been able to convey more emphasis on the effects of light and shadow in addition to color, citing as an example the early scene at the graveyard, where he felt he should have depicted greater contrast in the objects lit by sunlight, but joked that it was hard to say exactly how things would turn out until he actually painted them, something he said was true of the entire film. As Yamaga conveyed images to him only through words, Ogura was glad that he was allowed to be free to try to express them visually in his own way, particularly because even in evening shots, the director would specify to him whether it should depict evening close to dawn, the dead of night, or evening close to sunset, noting wryly that it was hard to express the difference between 3 a.m and 4 a.m. Looking back on the project from 2012, Ogura maintained that while he rarely rewatched his old work, he still felt the passion when he viewed a DVD of the film: "I thought there aren't a lot of people these days making [anime] with such a level of passion. Royal Space Force was very exciting, and so were the people around me."

In the 2000 director's commentary, Akai recalled his initial surprise that Yamaga wanted to use Nobuyuki Ohnishi's illustrations for the film's credits sequences, and that also "some of the animators felt there were better illustrators," a remark that made Yamaga laugh and comment, "The world of animators is a small one." At the time of Royal Space Force production, Ohnishi was known for his spot illustrations in the reader's corner section of Pia, a weekly Tokyo culture and entertainment magazine associated with the long-running Pia Film Festival, as well as his airplane illustrations drawn for the magazine Model Graphix, where an occasional fellow contributing artist was Hayao Miyazaki.  In a 1995 conversation with Animerica, Ohnishi remarked however that Yamaga's personal familiarity with his work came through Ohnishi's illustrations for the Japanese magazines Swing Journal, a jazz publication modeled on DownBeat, and ADLIB, covering fusion and pop. He remembered having been "a little surprised" when Yamaga first approached him, as Ohnishi had "considered animation at the time to be strictly for children, and his own work had always been directed towards adults," but that Yamaga assured him that the film "was going to be a very adult take on science fiction."

Yamaga had desired that the opening and ending credits show the world portrayed in the film from a different perspective, and felt that Ohnishi's method of using light and shadow was ideal for the purpose. He asked the artist to create an "image of inheritance," to convey a sense that this world did not exist only for the events told of in the film, but that it had existed also in its past, and would exist into its future as well. Although his illustration style used a sumi-e ink wash painting technique from classical East Asian art, Ohnishi commented that he was uninterested in traditional subjects such as "bamboo and old Chinese mountains," preferring instead to paint "the typewriter and the skyscraper," with a particular interest in 1950s-era objects. Ohnishi's approach in the credits made frequent use of photographs of real people and historical events, which he would then modify when adapting it into a painting: "exchanging and replacing the details of, for example, a European picture with Asian or Middle-Eastern elements and motifs. In this way, the credits would reflect both the cultural mixing that gives the film as a whole its appearance, and symbolize the blurring between our world and the film's world, thus serving [Royal Space Force] function as a 'kaleidoscopic mirror.'" The last painting in the opening credits, where Yamaga's name as director appears, is based on a photograph of Yamaga and his younger sister when they were children. Shiro's return alive from space is depicted in the first paintings of the ending credits; Yamaga remarked that they represent the photos appearing in textbooks from the future of the world of Royal Space Force.

Animation

After the completion in December 1985 of Daicon Film's final project, Orochi Strikes Again, its director Takami Akai and special effects director Shinji Higuchi moved to Tokyo to join the production of Royal Space Force as two of its three assistant directors, alongside Shoichi Masuo. Higuchi would make the first scene actually animated and filmed in Royal Space Force, depicting a newsreel of Shirotsugh arriving in the capital city; its look was achieved by filming the cels using the same 8mm camera that Daicon had used for its amateur productions. At age 20, Higuchi was the very youngest of the main crew; his previous creative experience had been in live-action special effects films rather than anime. Higuchi was described as someone who did not "think like an animator," and would therefore bring unorthodox and interesting ideas and techniques to the project. The director felt that Royal Space Force benefitted from the creative contributions of people from outside anime, including opening and ending credits artist Nobuyuki Ohnishi, and several part-time college design students who did not go on to pursue a career in animation; Akai and Yamaga joked in retrospect that, owing to their scant experience, at the time they themselves had limited familiarity with the anime industry.

The newsreel scene was located near the beginning of the storyboard's "C part". The third out of the anime's four roughly equal half-hour divisions, the C part began with the scene of Riquinni working in the field, and concluded with the assassination attempt. Royal Space Force followed the practice, adapted from TV episodes, of breaking the storyboard up into lettered parts; although intended to denote the parts before and after a mid-show commercial break, the practice was also used in theatrical works for convenience in production. As 1985 drew to a close, Bandai had still not formally committed to Royal Space Force as a feature-length film release, as a distributor for the movie had not yet been secured. Yamaga was also late in finalizing the storyboard, which would not be completed in its entirety until June 1986. However, the C part was nearly finished, and the decision was made to start production there, on the reasoning also that the sober tone of many C part scenes required precision in expression; as there was no release date yet, it was better to work on them while the schedule was still relatively loose. Higuchi remarked in a 2004 interview that because Yamaga's storyboards were minimalist, containing only the field size, the number of characters in the frame, and the placement of the dialogue, Royal Space Force was not made in a typical fashion for an anime, where the animators would be given directives to "draw this picture." Instead they were asked to "think out the performance in this scene," with meetings where the animators themselves determined how scenes would move by first physically acting them through as if they were attempting to convey it to an audience; the camera angles to be used were also decided by the animators through discussion. He described the process in retrospect as having been "a lot of fun," yet noted there were some animators who had refused to work in such a fashion, and backed away from the production.  Higuchi noted that he himself had doubted at first whether he'd made a mistake by joining the project, which he initially found difficult to understand.Royal Space Force assistant director Shoichi Masuo was an associate of Hideaki Anno, whom he had met when the two worked together on the 1984 Macross film. Anno had moved to Tokyo the previous year to pursue a career as an independent animator; Masuo and Anno, who were the same age were among the co-founders of Studio Graviton, a Tokyo office for animators working freelance such as themselves. Masuo described the roles of himself and the two other assistant directors: Higuchi had overall charge regarding the design aspects of the settei, Masuo was in charge over the color aspects of the settei, including backgrounds, whereas Akai monitored the work as a whole as general assistant to Yamaga. These roles were not fixed, and the three did not confer on a daily basis, but rather would have meetings on how to shift their approach whenever changes in the production situation called for it. Masuo noted as well that he had the most experience of the three in animation, and if an animator seemed confused over abstract directives from Yamaga, Masuo would explain in concrete terms how to execute the director's intent. Regarding the animation style of Royal Space Force, Masuo remarked that it was generally straightforward, without the characteristic quirky techniques to create visual interest or amusement often associated with anime, but that "there's nothing else [in anime] like this where you can do proper acting and realistic mechanical movements. That's why its impression is quite cinematic...In animation, it's very difficult to do something normal. When you consider [Royal Space Force], there are many scenes where the characters are just drinking tea or walking around. You don't take notice of [such actions], yet they're very difficult to draw, and I think it required a lot of challenging work for the key animators." Following Royal Space Force, Masuo would remain closely associated with the works of both Gainax and Anno's later Studio khara as a key animator, technical director, and mechanical designer before his death in 2017.

In January 1986, Toho-Towa agreed to distribute Royal Space Force as a feature film, and production assumed a more frantic pace, as the process of in-betweening, cel painting, and background painting began at this time; additional staff was recruited via advertisements placed in anime magazines. Gainax relocated its studio once again, this time from Takadanobaba to a larger studio space in the Higashi-cho neighborhood of Kichijoji, where the remainder of Royal Space Force would be produced.  Following the C part of the film, the animation production proceeded in order from the A part (the opening scene through the fight in the air force lounge), to the B part (the arrival at the rocket factory through the funeral for Dr. Gnomm), then to the concluding D part (the General's talk on history to the film's ending). The daily exchange of ideas between Yamaga and the other staff at Gainax continued during production, as the artists attempted to understand his intentions, and Yamaga requested that animation drawings, designs, and background paintings to be re-done in order to get closer to the "image in his head;" the film's artists also exchanged opinions on the images between themselves.

Although Royal Space Force was essentially a pre-digital animated work using layers of physical cels and backgrounds painted by hand, computers played an important role in its production. Scheduling and accounting on the film was performed using a Fujitsu OASYS100, while design drawings were scanned into a NEC PC-9801 which permitted them to be studied at different rotations and for possible color options, using a 256-color palette. Rough draft animation of line drawings testing how sequences would work utilized a Quick Action Recorder computer-controlled video camera, a technology by that point common in the anime industry. Computer-assisted animation seen onscreen in Royal Space Force was used for certain difficult motion shots, including the contra-rotating propellers of the Honnêamise air force plane, the rotation of the space capsule while in orbit, the tilted wheel turn of the street sweeper, and the swing of the instrument needle in the launch control bunker. The motions themselves were rendered using ASCII 3D software, and then traced onto cels. By contast, Ryusuke Hikawa noted that the flakes of frost falling from the rocket at liftoff, which might be assumed to be a CG effect, were done entirely by hand under the supervision of Hideaki Anno.

Anno remarked that two frequent criticisms of Royal Space Force were that "there was no need to make this as an anime" (i.e., as opposed to a live action film), but also contrariwise that "it could have looked more like a [typical] anime;" however, he maintained that both viewpoints missed what had been essential for the film, the intent of which was that the audience perceive reality in an authentic sense. Anno argued that one of the advantages of filmmaking through using 'animation' (he felt it was more accurate in the case of Royal Space Force to speak instead of the advantages of using 'pictures') was the fine degree of control it permitted the creator as a tool for presenting images, and that the high level of detail in the film was not for the sake of imitating live action, but for the conceptual goal of conveying a notion of reality. Anno in fact maintained his concern as an artist on the film was for the "image" rather than the "anime" per se, and that he made a conscious decision not to work in such "so-called animation", as he felt it would be inappropriate for Royal Space Force: "All I can say to people who want to see something more anime-like on their screen is that they should watch other anime."

A one-minute scene of Shiro and Marty conversing on the bed of a truck delivering the Royal Space Force's electromechanical computer, originally meant to precede Shiro's first training run in the capsule simulator, was scripted and animated for the film's B part, but was not included in the theatrical release. The scene was cut for reasons of length before it reached the audio recording stage; however, the 1990 Royal Space Force~The Wings of Honnêamise Memorial Box LaserDisc edition, described by Animage as a kodawari (committed to perfection) project of Bandai co-producer Shigeru Watanabe, would reassemble the film's sound team and voice actors Leo Morimoto and Kazuyuki Sogabe, and record the dialogue and sound effects for the scene. This one-minute scene would also be included on subsequent DVD and Blu-ray editions of Royal Space Force.

Many of the staff of Royal Space Force had also worked on two of the major anime film projects released in 1986: Project A-ko and Castle in the Sky, including Royal Space Force assistant director Masuo and animation director Yuji Moriyama on A-ko; design artist and key animator Mahiro Maeda had worked on Castle in the Sky, as did Noriko Takaya, who had earlier developed for its director Hayao Miyazaki the "harmony" method used to portray the shifting carapace of the Ohm in Nausicaä; the technique would be used also for the rocket nozzles in Royal Space Force. By the summer of 1986, both works were completed, and a large number of their crew joined the production of Royal Space Force, which by that point was running on a round-the-clock schedule.

Yamaga would later say of the making of Royal Space Force, "it was like we were all swinging swords with our eyes blindfolded". Akai and Yamaga remarked that since they weren't "animation purists," they altered the animation drawings, cels, and timesheets in ways that were not traditional industry practice, to the extent that "the young people who followed in our footsteps in creating anime thought that was how it was done," speculating that they may have created new traditions for anime by breaking the old on the production of Royal Space Force. The idea that Royal Space Force would not use anime's traditional division of labor and strictly assigned roles was developed while it was still in the pre-production stage. Masuo compared Gainax's production system to putting on a school festival, with everyone sharing ideas and participating wherever they could. Higuchi laughed that while as assistant director he supervised with a "blueprint" of what the film would be like, there were times when the finished work turned out to be completely different, and he thought, "Oh..." In 1995, Okada reflected that the film "was made in that kind of chaos ... On a Gainax anime project, everyone has to be a director. Therefore, everyone's feelings and everyone's knowledge are going into it ... That's the good side of how Gainax's films are different from others. But we have no strong director, and that's the weak side." On the director's commentary, Yamaga himself noted that when the film's final retakes were done at the end of 1986, out of 100 adjustments made to scenes, only three were based on the director's own suggestions.  Akai had personally rejected other change requests by Yamaga on the basis of representing the opinions of the entire staff and making sure that "everyone was being heard". Yamaga replied, "I was just pleased that everyone was so involved in the project. I hadn't expected that to happen. It was a wonderful time. At the beginning, I was expected to make all the decisions, but as time went by, the staff started to understand that I wasn't going to make all the decisions and that they were going to have to get involved. By the end of the project, nobody cared what I had to say ... I thought that was great."

Cinematography

As a pre-digital anime, the scenes in Royal Space Force were created by using a camera to photograph the animation cels and backgrounds onto movie film. A scene would typically consist of a series of separate individual shots known as "cuts," with each cut being prepared for the photographer by collecting into a bag all animation cels and background elements to be used in that particular cut. Akai noted that Anno's animation of the flakes of frost falling from the rocket at liftoff required so many cels  that the cuts for the scene were carried in a box, rather than a bag. The director of photography on Royal Space Force was Hiroshi Isakawa of Mushi Production, where the animation for the pilot film had been shot in early 1985. Isakawa had subsequently been asked to direct photography on the full-length film as well; in an interview after the film's completion, he remarked that he was originally assured photography could begin in April 1986, but received no cuts to film until August and September, and then "only the easy work," with Gainax putting off completing the more difficult scenes until later. Isakawa joked that as it was not until October that the cuts began to come in at a steady pace, it was difficult for him to determine exactly how much progress they were making on the film. The most intense period of work occurred in January 1987; Isakawa completed the filming for Royal Space Force at the end of that month, noting that with the off-and-on nature of the task, the photography had taken three months of actual time.

Besides the technical necessity to photograph the animation, Gainax's own prior experience in filming amateur live-action works had a broader influence on the construction of the animated scenes themselves; the sequence early in Royal Space Force where Tchallichammi and Shiro converse in the bathroom is described in the director's commentary as a "simple scene" which was nevertheless redone many times as the staff debated the relative motions and placement of the two characters "as if we were shooting this in live-action." Akai and Yamaga remarked that it had not been their intent as animators to "emulate" live-action films, but rather to make animation with a realism based on their experience of "look(ing) through the camera lens to see what it sees ... there weren't many people who could [both] draw and understand how the camera works ... It's difficult to express animated films realistically. The camera doesn't really exist." Another reflection of their live-action experience involved building scale models of Marty's motorcycle, the Honnêamise naval jet and air force prop planes, and the Royal Space Force headquarters building. These models were used as reference aids for the animators, but also to choose which angles and viewpoints to use in scenes where the modelled objects would appear; in the figurative sense, to "decide where the cameras should be."

Many of the scenes in the film would be created through special photographic techniques applied to the underlying animation; an example was the appearance of the television screen in the Royal Space Force barracks. Gainax came up with the idea to take a clear acrylic panel cover from a fluorescent lamp and place it over the animation cels depicting the TV broadcast, moving the cover around as the cels were photographed; the motion of the prismatic pattern on the cover simulated the look of an image with varying reception quality. The appearance and disappearance of an analog television's cathode ray-generated images as a channel was switched or the set turned off was further simulated by using a photo compositing technique, as it was felt employing a simple camera fade would reduce the realism of the effect. The TV screen images were shot at the T Nishimura studio, a photography specialist that would later contribute to 1989's Patlabor: The Movie.

Isakawa described the technical challenges he faced in filming Gainax's work on Royal Space Force, with some individual cuts created by using as many as 12 photographic levels consisting of cels, superimposition layers, and sheets of paper masks designed to capture isolated areas of different colored transmitted light (a photographic technique useable with translucent items such as animation cels, where the image can also be illuminated by light passing through the object, rather than only by reflected light). Some of the cel layers arrived with dust and scratches, which posed additional difficulties for Isakawa; he considered obscuring them with the popular method of employing a polarizing filter, but felt he could not use the technique, as such filters also obscured fine details in the cel art. Isakawa remarked that Gainax had however largely avoided what he described as the common errors in the anime industry of cels not being long enough for their background paintings, or having misaligned attachment points to peg bars. Another challenging aspect for Isakawa involved motion rather than light, such as conveying the heavy vibrations of Marty's motorcycle, or the air force plane cockpit; whereas ordinarily such scenes would be filmed while shaking the cels and the backgrounds as a unit, Gainax insisted that the elements be shaken separately.

Yamaga and Shinji Higuchi, who also served as assistant director of photography on the film, had Isakawa watch The Right Stuff and showed him NASA photos as a reference for the look they wished to achieve in certain shots. In an effort to convey a sense of the visual mystery of the film's world from space, Isakawa photographed the animation art through such tiny holes made in the paper masks for transmitted light that he felt the images could hardly be said to be lit at all; he was unable to judge the exact light levels needed in advance, having to make adjustments afterwards based on examining the developed film. Higuchi related that he had made the holes using an acupuncture needle he had obtained from a masseur on the film's staff. Isakawa mentioned that he would get tired and angry after being asked to shoot five or six different takes of a cut, not seeing the necessity for it, but gave up resisting when he realized it was a work "in pursuit of perfection," and felt that the final achievement was "realistic without using the imagery of live action, a work that made full use of anime's best merits."

Iwao Yamaki of the studio Animation Staff Room, who had been director of photography on Harmagedon and The Dagger of Kamui, served as photography supervisor on Royal Space Force, assisting Isakawa and Yamaga with advice on specific shooting techniques; his suggestions included the fog effect in the sauna where the Republic officials discuss the Honnêamise kingdom's launch plans, achieved by photographing the cels through a pinhole screen, and creating the strata of thin clouds that Shiro's training flight flies through using a slit-scan method. Isakawa and Yamaki were both 20 years older than Yamaga; Yamaki remarked that Gainax's filmmaking without knowledge of established techniques opened the possibility of "many adventures," and whereas his generation had adventures through what they already knew, Yamaki wanted the next generation of filmmakers to have "different adventures," that necessitated taking new risks. Yamaki approvingly quoted Yamaga that the nature of Royal Space Force as a film was not defined by the fact it was an anime, but through how it used the techniques of anime to the fullest extent to ultimately achieve filmic effects beyond if it had been a live-action work, which Yamaga believed was the way for anime to prove its value as a cinematic medium.

Voice acting

The voice performances in Royal Space Force were supervised by Atsumi Tashiro of the anime studio Group TAC. Tashiro, who had been sound director for the highly influential 1974 TV series Space Battleship Yamato and subsequent Yamato movies, as well as for the 1985 Gisaburo Sugii film Night on the Galactic Railroad, remarked that in the more than 20 years of his career, Royal Space Force was the first time he had agreed to direct the sound for a work made outside his own company. Gainax had been enthusiastic in pursuing Tashiro's involvement, first sending him the script of the film, followed by a visit from Yamaga and Okada to explain the script, after which, Tashiro joked, he still couldn't understand it, even with several follow-up meetings. Despite his initial difficulty in grasping the project, however, Tashiro was struck by the passion and youth of the filmmakers, and felt that working with them on Royal Space Force would represent an opportunity to "revitalize" himself professionally. Tashiro's relationship with the studio would continue after the film into Gainax's next two productions: their first OVA series Gunbuster, which modeled the character Captain Tashiro upon him, and their debut TV show, Nadia: The Secret of Blue Water, in which Group TAC was closely involved.

In the director's commentary, Yamaga remarked that he "wanted the dialogue to be natural," which he maintained was "a first in Japanese animation." Akai felt that a tone had been set for Royal Space Force by the decision to cast Leo Morimoto in the lead role as Shirotsugh: "The other actors knew that this was going to be a different kind of animated film when we cast Leo." Morimoto was a 43-year old veteran actor in live-action films and TV but had very limited experience in anime, whereas Mitsuki Yayoi, cast as Riquinni after Gainax had heard her on the radio, was a stage actor and member of the Seinenza Theater Company with some voice-over experience, but who had never before played an anime role. While remarking that there were already many professional voice actors who were suited to animation work, Tashiro saw the casting of Morimoto and Yayoi as a great opportunity for him, asserting that the apprehension the performers felt due to their mutual unfamiliarity with the field meant that they approached their roles as an actual encounter, with genuine emotion and reactions that were honest and fresh, a spirit that Tashiro said he had forgotten within the world of anime.

Morimoto remarked during a recording session for the film in late November 1986 that Tashiro directed him not to play the role of Shirotsugh as if it were an anime, but rather to attempt the flavor of a live performance, noting in a later interview that Yamaga had given him the same instructions. He commented that it was a difficult role for him, as unlike a live-action drama, "you can't fake the mood, you have to express yourself correctly with just your voice," and viewed his work on Royal Space Force as "scary" but "fulfilling." Although evaluating the character himself as "not a great hero," Morimoto at the same time said that he found much that was convincing in Shirotsugh's growth in the film, feeling that it somehow came to assume the role of history's own progression: "What is to be found at the end of that maturation is gradually revealed, arriving at a magnificent place." He added he was "shocked that a 24-year old could make such a film ... I'm glad to know that [creators] like this are making their debut, and I hope that more of them do." Asked what he wanted people to particularly watch for in the film, Morimoto answered that most adults, by which he included himself, "talk a lot about 'young people these days,' and so forth. But the truth is these young people who hear that from us are able to be clear about this world with an ease adults no longer possess. They have a firm grasp of history, and they don't shy away from the parts in this film that adults have avoided; they call out the lies, while at the same time, each one of them puts in their work with sincerity."

Yayoi commented that Yamaga had described Riquinni to her as "uncompromising in her beliefs, and this could be seen as hardheadedness and causing problems or discomfort to those around her. But also that she could look upon something truly beautiful, yet not respond simply by thinking that yes, it is beautiful, but might ponder it, and wonder if it genuinely is. It's not a disability or a deliberate obstacle [in her character], but just that people around her would honestly think that this girl is a little bit weird." Yayoi understood Riquinni as a "normal girl" who, to the extent she was out of step with everyday life, was not so much because she was strange on the inside, but because her relationships with the exterior world were governed by her strong will; Yayoi suggested that the film is her coming-of-age story as well. Asked if there was anything she felt in common with Riquinni, Yayoi, herself in her early 20s, spoke first of their shared youth, and how while Riquinni's personal way of expressing her authenticity was through her religious beliefs, authenticity was a widely shared ideal of young people, and in that sense Riquinni represented "the parts of me that are genuine." Yayoi however could imagine herself also as sometimes expressing those genuine feelings directly, and sometimes holding them back with measured speech, interpreting Shirotsugh and Riquinni's final rendezvous in the film as an example of the latter; rather than any dramatic statements or tears, she noted, Riquinni simply ends the encounter with an itterasshai ("come back soon") as he departs. "But in her heart," said Yayoi,  "she's thinking, 'Well, this will be the last time we meet,' laughing to the interviewer, 'Don't we all know what that feels like?'"

In contrast to the animation itself on Royal Space Force, whose scenes were completed out of sequence before being edited together, the dialogue was recorded in sequence; Yamaga commented that at the beginning of the film, "everyone was unsure of their character. But by the end of the project, I no longer needed to give any direction," to the extent, Akai noted, that Morimoto ad-libbed Shirotsugh's song upon arriving at the rocket launch site guarded by dummy tanks. Yamaga suggested that an emphasis in Japanese voice acting upon clear voice projection worked against a realistic-sounding delivery in certain circumstances such as military communications or PA announcements, citing the performances Mamoru Oshii later obtained in the Patlabor anime as an example of what he wished he could have achieved for Royal Space Force.

In his 2010 memoir, Okada recalled his dismay at finding out that the Star Quest dub being recorded for Royal Space Force Hollywood premiere intended to use only seven actors to voice the English version, contrasting it to the over 40 performers used in the Japanese original, and its assignment of special actors even to voice characters with only two or three lines, to give them each a distinct "color." Minoru Uchida, another veteran actor with little history in anime, voiced the role of General Khaidenn, whereas the most prominent part in the film actually performed by an experienced anime voice actor was that of Marty Tohn, portrayed by Kazuyuki Sogabe, whom Akai noted also assisted on giving direction with some of the other voice actors. Akai himself had a voice cameo as the soldier giving orders outside the Defense Ministry shortly before the General's meeting with his superiors. The reporter whose voice is heard in the newsreel of Shiro's training regimen and the exterior shots before his abortive TV interview was Kazuo Tokumitsu, at the time host of the nationwide weekday morning television show Zoom In!! Morning! on NTV; the network, which was collaborating on the film's publicity, had requested halfway through production that the movie feature voices from their talent base. Yamaga and Akai remarked that by this stage only the news voice-overs were available, and it was too late to redraw the newsreel reporter so that he actually resembled Tokumitsu; they recalled being a bit embarrassed at how the situation had caused the network a certain offense. Actors with a foreign background were employed to portray the voices of characters from the Republic, whose dialogue was delivered in a made-up language; an example being the role of Republic minister Nereddon, voiced by Willie Dorsey, a black American actor resident in Japan who had previously appeared in several Sonny Chiba films, including The Executioner.

Music

In April 1986, Ryuichi Sakamoto was selected as the musical director of Royal Space Force. Sakamoto was already regarded for his work in the pioneering electronic band Yellow Magic Orchestra and his soundtrack for the 1983 Nagisa Oshima film Merry Christmas, Mr. Lawrence which had won the United Kingdom BAFTA Award for Best Film Music; the year following the release of Royal Space Force, Sakamoto would share the Academy Award for Best Original Score with David Byrne and Cong Su for their soundtrack to The Last Emperor. In 1986 Sakamoto was prominent also in the Japanese domestic film market for his soundtrack to the top-grossing nationwide movie of that year, Koneko Monogatari. Sakamoto brought into the Royal Space Force project his prior collaborators on Koneko Monogatari, musicians Koji Ueno, Yuji Nomi, and Haruo Kubota. During a 1998 interview with Kentaro Takekuma, Hiroyuki Yamaga remarked that asking Sakamoto to do the music for Royal Space Force required a special increase of 40 million yen above its previous 360 million yen budget, which, together with an additional 40 million yen deficit incurred while making the film, raised its final production costs to 440 million yen, and, when including advertising expenses, its estimated total costs in the accounting records to 800 million yen.

The first commercial release of music for the project occurred three months before the Japanese debut of the film itself, in the form of a December 1986 limited edition The Wings of Honnêamise: Image Sketch 12" maxi single, issued on School, Sakamoto’s label under Midi Records, and containing early mixes of four key initial pieces he had composed for the film's soundtrack, referred to on Image Sketch only under the names "Prototype A", "Prototype B", "Prototype C", and "Prototype D". Sakamoto commented in the liner notes for Image Sketch that when he first heard the movie was going to be called "Royal Space Force", he thought that based on the title it was going to be "a film by a far-right organization (my mistake!)" He stated that what struck him immediately about the film's storyboards was "the precision of its detail" which convinced him that "these people probably liked the same things I did," and that one of the main reasons he accepted the job was that he saw a resemblance between the meticulous care he put into his music and the efforts the filmmakers were taking with Royal Space Force. Sakamoto concluded by expressing his belief that such "finely crafted" contemporary Japanese animation and music would henceforth be increasingly exported to overseas markets in the future. Yamaga's own remarks in the liner notes declared that "while it was true that this [film] was not made entirely from original materials," it possessed as its "underlying image, a collection of 'deep sensibilities'" that arose from the distinct personal characteristics of each creator who worked upon it, "a shout from each individual’s unique sense of self that bleeds through even if covered over. In the same way, Mr. Sakamoto dismissed using the styles of fill-in-the-blank, and created an ultimate sound based on his own personal sensibility. I hope you will enjoy that profound deep sensibility of his own."

In an interview conducted shortly before the movie's release with Ueno, Kubota, and Keiko Shinozaki, the A&R coordinator for Midi, Shinozaki described the working process behind the composition of the film music. Ueno, Kubota, and Nomi took as their starting points a set of "keywords" that Yamaga had given them as director, together with the four prototype compositions Sakamoto (whom they referred to as kyōju, "Professor") had made. Kubota detailed the creation of the "chart table" that determined the placement of the various soundtrack elements; made by the music director and sound director [that is, by Sakamoto and Atsumi Tashiro], the chart noted each scene that would require music, which, as Kubota remarked, naturally determined, based on scene length, the length of the needed music. The chart also included notes on the basic kind of music to be used in the scene, and in particular, which of the four prototypes to use as a basis for their arrangements. Ueno, Kubota, and Nomi then decided which scenes in the film they would each arrange, and went to work on their arrangements separately, neither working on them in the studio together, or with Sakamoto. After arranging a piece, they would reassemble as a group and listen to each other's work, and then go their separate ways once again to continue the process.

Of the 47 musical arrangements made for the film based on the chart, of which 15 were later selected to be featured on The Wings of Honnêamise~Royal Space Force Original Soundtrack released in March 1987, most were developed as different variations on one of Sakamoto’s original four prototypes; for example, "Prototype A" would become the basis of the Original Soundtrack  "Main Theme"; whereas "Prototype B" would become "Riquinni's Theme." A few pieces were created based on arrangements combining two of the prototypes, as with "Rishō", used during the ascent of Shiro in the rocket. 13 of the 47 pieces, however, were not based on any of the four basic prototypes, but were instead new original compositions created later in the soundtrack process by Ueno, Kubota, Nomi, or Sakamoto himself. Several of these 13 pieces were featured on the Original Soundtrack, including Sakamoto's "Ministry of Defense," used for the General's nighttime meeting with his superiors, Kubota and Ueno's "War," used for the battle to capture the launch site, Nomi's "The Final Stage," played after the General decides to proceed with the countdown, and Ueno's "Dr. Gnomm's Funeral". Two of the 47 pieces combined variations on the prototypes with new material, most prominently "Out To Space," used for Shiro's monologue from orbit and the subsequent visionary sequence, which employed successive variations on "B" and "A", followed by an additional original composition by Sakamoto. The background music pieces not included on the Original Soundtrack would eventually be collected as a bonus feature on the 1990 Royal Space Force~The Wings of Honnêamise Memorial Box LaserDisc edition, where the pieces were accompanied by images from the film's concept art; this bonus feature would also be included as an extra on the 2000 Manga Entertainment DVD.

Toshio Okada made only two brief mentions of Sakamoto’s musical role on Royal Space Force in his memoir; in his 1995 interview with Animerica, Okada had remarked that he was not personally a fan of Sakamoto’s music: "I didn't really like Sakamoto's style back then, or even now. But I know his talent, his ability to construct a strong score, and write an entire orchestration. That’s why I chose him," asserting that "at that time, he was the only choice for an original movie soundtrack. Composers for ordinary anime music can make a pop song, something in the enka style— you know, just songs, like an opening theme. But they can't do orchestration, or a sad melody like ["Riquinni's Theme"]." When asked if he had considered approaching Jo Hisaishi, associated with scoring the films of Hayao Miyazaki, Okada replied, "Jo Hisaishi always writes one or two melodies, and the rest of the soundtrack is constructed around them. You can see that in Nausicaä and Laputa. But his kind of style wouldn't have worked for [Royal Space Force]. As I said— for better or worse, the film has a very differentiated structure, and we needed a score to match that. So I told Sakamoto, "Don't make the soundtrack all by yourself. You should direct it, but get a staff with real musical talent, young and old, and incorporate their work."

Whereas Sakamoto's own 2009 autobiography made extensive reference to his other 1987 film project The Last Emperor, it does not discuss Royal Space Force. Sakamoto’s film score for the Kōbun Shizuno film My Tyrano: Together, Forever was reported by media outlets in 2018 as his first time composing a soundtrack for an animated work; noting his recent 
Grammy and Golden Globe nominations for The Revenant, The Hollywood Reporter quoted Sakamoto as saying that "he had avoided animated film projects for a long time because he was more used to composing for serious live-action dramas" while The Japan Times related, "Ryuichi Sakamoto has spent a career steeped in high drama [but] the Japanese star revealed he had now realized a childhood dream by working for the first time in animation. 'I grew up watching Astro Boy,' said Sakamoto, referring to the cartoon crime fighter. 'So I have a great respect for this world.'" Earlier that year, in an interview with film critic Nobuhiro Hosoki during Sakamoto’s visit to the Tribeca Film Festival for the screening of the documentary on his career Ryuichi Sakamoto: Coda, the composer remarked that he had been in charge of the music for an anime film "35 [sic] years ago, but I didn't like it very much (so I can't say the title)."

Commenting on Sakamoto’s remarks in 2018, Okada recalled that the composer had been sincerely excited about creating the music for Royal Space Force early on in the project, and had studied its storyboards closely for inspiration; the liner notes for the 1987 Original Soundtrack album noted a music planning meeting where the enthusiasm was so great that the participants ended up staying for 12 hours. Okada felt that Sakamoto may have viewed the storyboards, with their breakdown of scene lengths into seconds, as a guide that would permit him to achieve a perfect sync between his music and the images; however, Okada noted, the actual length of a finished cut of animation may vary slightly from the storyboard, and ultimately the sound director has the prerogative to edit or adjust the music accordingly to fit. Okada believed that such issues could have been resolved if he had the opportunity to speak directly with Sakamoto and make adjustments, but after a point communication with Sakamoto had become indirect, relayed through his then-management, Yoroshita Music. The composer himself had been away from Japan during the final months of Royal Space Force production, which overlapped with the shooting schedule of The Last Emperor that had begun in China in early August 1986 and which was still continuing as of February 1987 in Rome; Sakamoto had been working in both locations as an actor in the film, portraying the role of Masahiko Amakasu. Okada asserted that although Sakamoto and Yamaga themselves never came into conflict, the situation led to frustration among the film’s staff, and in particular between Yoroshita and sound director Atsumi Tashiro; Tashiro eventually asked Okada to make the call as to whether he or Sakamoto would have final say on placing the music.  Okada chose Tashiro, remarking that he accepted responsibility for the decision although he believed that it was what soured Sakamoto on Royal Space Force, to the extent of not discussing it as part of his professional history as a film composer.

Release

Marketing

"Royal Space Force was put into production at the very height of the first surge in [anime] video sales, when a studio's ownership of an all-new product, deeply ingrained in the newfound market of adult fans and active fandom, made 'by fans for fans', was immensely tempting. One imagines that investors hoped to bootstrap a new Gundam or a new Yamato out of nothing, which might have explained the enthusiasm during production for a possible movie sequel or television spin-off. However, as the footage of Royal Space Force neared completion in late 1986, and was found to be inconveniently free of many merchandising spin-off opportunities, there were signs among the investors and sponsors of cold feet."
In a 2013 survey of the last century of the anime industry, Jonathan Clements devotes three pages to a case study of the distribution and exhibition issues surrounding Royal Space Force, describing "outrageous attempts" by the film's financial backers "to 'fix' the ailing film project," not by changing the film itself, but through a deceptive marketing campaign that began with "prolonged arguments over a sudden perceived need to rename it". The project had been pitched, developed, and approved for production under the name Royal Space Force; Okada remarked that, to Gainax, it was "its one and only title". All Nippon Airways, one of the film's sponsors, however desired that the title include the word "wings," while Bandai favored that the title should use the form "Something of Something," on the reasoning that the last big anime hit had been called Nausicaä of the Valley of the Wind. Over the course of 1986, more than 20 other titles for the film had been suggested to Gainax by outside parties, including Space • Love • Story, Myth of Passion, Young Morning Star Shirotsugh, Spirits of Fire, Song of Icarus, Parallel Zone 1987, and Zero Vertex.
As Royal Space Force "was 'not sexy enough and Riquinni was "conveniently female," the initial push was to use the title (The) Wings of Riquinni.

Although the plan to make Royal Space Force had been known around the anime industry since mid-1985, the official announcement of the film was not made until June 4, 1986 in a press conference held at the prestigious Imperial Hotel in Tokyo. Ryuichi Sakamoto, who was the only member of Royal Space Force main staff known to the general public spoke at the event, remarking that Royal Space Force would be his third film soundtrack and that its details reminded him of one of his favorite movies, Blade Runner. The announcement at the Imperial Hotel used Royal Space Force as the main title of the film, with (The) Wings of Riquinni as a smaller subtitle; privately, Yamaga objected strongly to the subtitle, pointing out the purpose of the film was to expand the audience's view of the world, and that he did not want a title that focused on one character; therefore, if a second title was absolutely required, he suggested it use Honnêamise after the name of the kingdom in which most of the film's events takes place. As 1986 drew to a close, the battle over the film's final name could be traced through updates on the project in the anime press; in the October 1986 issue of The Anime, just half a year before the film's release to Japanese theaters, the movie logo was still listed as it had appeared at the June announcement, with a large Royal Space Force above a smaller (The) Wings of Riquinni. In the following month's issue, the logo no longer contained (The) Wings of Riquinni, and now read The Wings of Honnêamise~Royal Space Force, with Royal Space Force moved to the bottom, but both titles at equal size. By the December 1986 issue, the logo had assumed its final theatrical release form, with Royal Space Force now smaller than The Wings of Honnêamise.

In a 2010 memoir, Okada reflected on the conflict, asserting that it had involved not only the title, but that at one point Bandai had also requested Gainax cut the film's length from two hours to 80 minutes. Okada considered that it had been a "natural" request from a sponsor's perspective, as a movie theater would give four daily showings to a two-hour film, but six if it were only 80 minutes, opening the possibility of 50% more ticket sales. At the time, however, Okada refused, arguing that the box office performance was not part of his job, and telling the theatrical distributor and Bandai in a meeting that if they wanted to cut the film by even 20 minutes, they might as well cut off Okada's arm. In retrospect, Okada felt that he had acted like a child, but that "creators are all children," and if they were making something new and interesting, then in the end everyone involved should profit; he acknowledged, however, that in the meantime it was the "grown-ups" who had to deal with the risks and problems along the way, yet to him, acting like such a "responsible adult" would have meant going along with a deceptive compromise and being just a chouseiyaku (fixer). Bandai company president Makoto Yamashina affirmed shortly before the film's release that he had indeed thought of cutting 20 minutes from the film: "There were about three weeks during which we considered cutting it. Toho-Towa was going through the same thing, but the process of deciding what [scenes] to cut began with conversations about why they shouldn't be cut. And afterwards, I thought, 'Ah, I get it now' and felt that I couldn't cut it. And with apologies toward Toho-Towa, to please go along with this ... For the sake of the box office, it could have worked at around 100 minutes, but if we cut the film at this stage, the whole objective of the movie flies out the window, and the hundreds of millions of yen spent on it have no meaning. So I apologized—I'll be responsible if it's not a hit, so please let me do it as it is."

Okada wrote of having later heard how "emotions were running high" on the Bandai side as well, to the extent of considering taking the project away from Gainax and giving it to another studio to finish, or even cancelling the film's release, despite the 360 million yen already spent on producing it. However, this would have required someone's "head to roll" at Bandai to take responsibility for the loss, which could mean Makoto Yamashina himself, who had announced Royal Space Force as his personal project durung the official press conference in June. Okada noted that the person caught in the middle was Shigeru Watanabe, who had supported the project from the beginning and had secured Bandai's funding for Gainax, but now found himself "forced into a very difficult position," becoming so depressed by the conflict that following the film's release, he took a year's leave of absence. Okada expressed great regret for what he described as his lack of kindness at the time toward Watanabe, on whom he had taken out his anger and sense of betrayal, but nevertheless did not regret his lack of compromise, believing that if he had given any ground, the film might have not been completed.

Clements remarked, "the promotions unit did everything in their power to make Honnêamise appeal to precisely the same audience as Nausicaä, even if that meant misleading advertising," citing one example recalled by Okada as "the 'insect incident', in which the artist [Yoshiyuki] Sadamoto was commissioned to draw an image of a giant spider-beetle attacking the city from the film. The insect in question only appeared in the film as a finger-length child's pet, although the advert gave the impression that it would grow into a house-sized behemoth equivalent to the giant ohmu in Nausicaä. Okada was incensed, not only at the apparent conspiracy to mislead audiences about his film, but that the producers would assent to wasting the time of Sadamoto, who spent three days on the commission. Okada felt ... that, if he had three days to spare, he [as one of the film's animation directors] could have better utilised the time by correcting several problematic scenes in the film itself." Okada had earlier affirmed the deceptive marketing push in a 1995 interview: "Toho-Towa was the distributor of The Wings of Honnêamise, and they didn't have any know-how, or sense of strategy to deal with the film ... And they were thinking that this film must be another Nausicaä, because Nausicaä was the last 'big anime hit.' But when they finally saw Wings, they realized it was not another Nausicaä [PANICKED SCREAM] and they thought, 'Okay, okay ... we'll make it Nausicaä in the publicity campaign!"

Yamashina had himself acknowledged that although Bandai's plan to sell one million tickets for the film at the box office was based on that having been the sales performance for Nausicaä, "the content of this work isn’t like Nausicaä ... No one’s ever done something like this before, so it’s a great risk in that respect." In 2000, Akai recalled, "The PR department didn't really seem to understand the film. They have a tendency to make a new release interesting by making it appear similar to a film that was previously a hit." Yamaga remarked that, "There was no precedent in advertising a film like ours at the time. When they are asked what type of a film it is, they can only compare it to something like Nausicaä. It's actually completely different. But Nausicaä at least served as a reference when we were asked to describe our film. If it wasn't for that precedent, there would have been no reference point at all. We could never have explained why it was animated or why it was a theatrical release, or much of anything about it."

The national publicity campaign for the film now being promoted under the title The Wings of Honnêamise~Royal Space Force began on New Year's Day, 1987, including full-color newspaper and magazine ads, as well as TV commercials,  with eventual placements in over 70 media outlets. As with the "insect incident," a frequent aspect of the marketing push involved taking images from the film and presenting them in ads as fantastical. Akai gives as one example the steam train on which General Khaidenn departs for the capital to seek funding; advertisements labeled it as a "bio-train". The official press kit for the theatrical release presented Riquinni and her book of scriptures as elements in a prophecy of salvation that drove the plot, describing the premise of the film as: "'... Through the guidance of a lass with a pure and untainted soul, those who are awakened shall take wing and rise to Heaven, taking in hand the Honneamise holy book' ... Shirotsugh grew up to join the Royal Space Force, as did other youths as hot blooded and energetic as he. It was then that work began on a grand project to search space for the envisioned holy book that promises eternal peace to Honneamise." The weathered standing stone seen briefly outside the church storeroom where Riquinni lives during the latter part of the story, while given no particular meaning in the film itself, was made into a major feature of the film's advertising, relabeled as a "Symbol Tower" that shines due to what ads described as a secret telepathic link born from the "passionate love" between Shirotsugh and Riquinni; one of the film's trailers opened with an image of the glowing "tower" struck by lightning, then rising through the clouds as Riquinni prays before it while Shiro gazes up beside her; a caption proclaimed, "A world of love and youth, containing electrifying romance!" The only dialogue spoken in the trailer, "Do you believe in the miracle of love?" said by Riquinni's voice actor, Mitsuki Yayoi, was not a line from the actual film, but referenced a catchphrase used in the advertising campaign.

Japanese release

"We can't make any more movies on this level. It's not just the money, not just the passion, it's the way they put this together, piece by piece. It's not about whether the story is interesting or uninteresting. It's a matter of quality, and it's not possible to maintain this level. Or that may be the case. So I think they did a great job, and yet from a professional perspective, they've made something that's a problem. When you look at it from the viewpoint of the anime industry, it must be very difficult to make something on this level. I've recently come to understand just how demanding it was for them to put make this piece by piece. And once it comes out, it'll set a new standard, won't it? If whatever comes next doesn't equal or surpass it, then it'll be a regression in terms of quality ... Disney achieved the peak [in animation] 50 years ago. You can't surpass them. Even if Spielberg or someone like that tries, it would only be an extension of what Disney did, but it wouldn't surpass it. But perhaps this time Yamaga has shown us a different approach from Disney, another possibility. Whether or not it ends up making a major impact in animation, the possibility will remain. And that's why I think he's created something amazing."—Makoto Yamashina, 1987
Makoto Yamashina, the executive producer of Royal Space Force, detailed his conflicted feelings toward the final work and its box office prospects in an interview conducted shortly before the film's release in Japan: "If I had understood their concept earlier, I think I would have done it a little differently ... What they were trying to express is [found within] a visual world, so there are things that aren’t said in the script, that can’t be expressed with dialogue. The concept of the film couldn't be expressed without going ahead and making it. And after that there are no fixes; you now have this world that's been created, the world of Honnêamise, and it can’t be changed." When asked what changes he would have liked to have made, Yamashina answered, "The big difference from how I thought it was going to be was that their expression was so flat. I would have made everything a bit more emotional and expansive, like the rocket launch scene at the end. While I believe at the same time that this was one of the [filmmaking] methods employed by Yamaga and the others, nevertheless it's flat. Constantly. In the emotional sense. I was fine with the scenes, the concepts, the plot development, but I would express more emotion ..." Yamashina, citing the aerial action from Top Gun, 1987's highest-grossing film in Japan, felt that "movies these days are all about entertainment," whereas "How the protagonist lives—his way of life, feeling depressed, wondering if he's okay with himself. That part of life, from the best movies, that's what's missing. And I think Yamaga dared to do that part." Yamashina asserted that Honnêamise was so significant because it was "the first film made for this [young] generation by that generation," and related an incident where a friend of his who also "didn't understand [the film] at all" was bewildered at the reaction of a young girl sitting next to him at a test screening, whom he saw noisily "cackling with delight". His friend, said Yamashina, wondered if he was witnessing a "revolution in the film industry" that if it succeeded, would put an end to the previous generation of filmmaking.

To Yamashina, the contrast spoke to a paramount issue dating back to the original proposal for Royal Space Force—whether the creators were correct in their understanding of what their generation was truly looking for in a film; the pre-release research and test audience reactions had left Yamashina personally uncertain on this question: "I'm afraid that the theaters will be deserted, and no one will go to see the movie." On the other hand, Yamashina repeated his concern for the implications if the film did turn out to be a hit: "If this is the [new] line that Yamaga is setting out, then filmmakers in the future are going to have to follow this line," suggesting that the previous assumptions about movies "will all get blown away ... You won't be able to make [a hit movie for young people] unless you're of that same generation." Yamashina expressed the belief that directors the same age as himself such as Steven Spielberg and George Lucas could still connect with young audiences because "in America there isn't such a big gap" whereas "in Japan, the gap starts from around 25. There's a fault line between the generations" and that what Honnêamise was offering viewers was a new approach compared to Lucas and Spielberg, whose films he described as "entertainment, simple to grasp ... If it turns out that young people today are thinking along Yamaga's lines, at that level of sophistication, it's going to be very difficult [for other filmmakers]." Yamashina speculated on whether rapid generational change meant Yamaga should have made the movie when he was even younger in order to better connect with a teenage audience, remarking that the director first conceived the idea of the film at 19, but that the movie was not finished until he was 24. "It's hard for me to talk about the film like this, but regardless of whether or not it succeeds, it's a movie that I don't understand. Until it opens at the theater, we won't really know."

The world premiere of the film was held on February 19, 1987 at Mann's Chinese Theatre in Hollywood, California. Americans invited to the showing included anime fans from the Cartoon/Fantasy Organization, and several figures associated with U.S. science fiction cinema including The Terminator and Aliens actor Michael Biehn, as well as Blade Runner designer Syd Mead. The screening, intended to help build publicity for the film's release to theaters in Japan the following month, was arranged for and covered by the Japanese news media. Footage from the Hollywood event was incorporated into a half-hour Sunday morning promotional special, Tobe! Oneamisu no Tsubasa —Harukanaru hoshi no monogatari— ("Fly! The Wings of Honnêamise—Story of a Distant Star") that aired March 8 on Nippon TV, six days before the film's release in Japan. Although referred to in Japanese publicity materials as The Wings of Honnêamise~Royal Space Force "American prescreening," the film was shown under the name Star Quest, and presented in an English dub remarked upon by both U.S. and Japanese anime magazines covering the event for its differences from the original film; in particular its use of "Americanized" names for the characters and changes to their motivations: as examples, in Star Quest, Riquinni, now known as "Diane," opposes the space project from the beginning, whereas Shirotsugh, now known as "Randy," is more positive toward it, while the superiors of General Khaidenn, now known as "General Dixon," wish to use the rocket launch not as a provocation for war, but as a peace overture.

The Wings of Honnêamise~Royal Space Force was released nationwide in Japan on March 14, 1987 through Toho's foreign film branch theaters; in some smaller cities, it was shown as a double feature with the 1985 made-for-television film Ewoks: The Battle for Endor. In a roundtable discussion in late spring following the film's release, co-producer Hiroaki Inoue observed that he could say the film "put up a good fight," arguing that the average theater stay for original anime films was four weeks, and Castle in the Sky had shown for five; in one theater, Royal Space Force had managed a seven-week engagement. In 2002, Takeda recalled, "Not a single theater cancelled its run, and in some locations, it actually had a longer run than initially planned ... The budget scale meant that reclaiming all the production costs at the box office simply wasn't feasible." Clements commented, "Such a claim, however, obscures to a certain degree the goldrush tensions of the period, when Japan's booming bubble economy arguably resulted in more investors than a film warranted," contending that Royal Space Force might have been reasonably expected to make back its money on its initial release, had it been a more modestly-budgeted OVA as first conceived. On home video, the film's title was changed back to Royal Space Force, with The Wings of Honnêamise as a smaller subtitle, beginning with the 1990 Japanese laserdisc box set release. Although Gainax itself was nearly bankrupted by the project, Bandai was reported as having made back its money on the movie in September 1994, seven and a half years after its Japanese theatrical release; the anime continued to generate profit for them in the years to come.

English-language release

Toshio Okada, who had attended the Star Quest event together with writer/director Hiroyuki Yamaga, "concluded that a market did indeed exist in America for well-dubbed and subtitled animation," and after discussions with Bandai prepared a subtitled 16 mm film version of the film to be shown at the 1988 Worldcon in New Orleans, with the subsequent aim of making a "budget-priced videotape version" available in the United States. However, Royal Space Force did not receive an English-language commercial release until 1994, when a new English dub of the film was commissioned to Animaze and released by Manga Entertainment using its original 1987 Japanese theatrical release title, The Wings of Honnêamise: Royal Space Force. Previously active releasing anime in the United Kingdom, the dub of Honnêamise was Manga's debut project upon entering the US anime market.

The new English dub showed in over 20 movie theaters during 1994–95 in a 35 mm film version distributed by Tara Releasing  and in June 1995 the film was released by Manga Entertainment in separate dubbed and subtitled VHS versions followed in January 1997 by a bilingual closed-captioned laserdisc release by Manga Entertainment and Pioneer LDCA. Animerica, in a contemporary review, assessed the dub as "admirable in many respects," but remarked on several differences between the dialogue in the English subtitled and dubbed versions, noting that in the dubbed version of the film, Riquinni suggests that she herself is to blame both for Shirotsugh's attempt to rape her, as well as for the earlier destruction of her home, and that in the dub, Shirotsugh does not ask Marty about the possibility of being the villain of one's own life story; the review argued that the subtitled version represents "a clearer presentation of the original ideas and personalities created by Hiroyuki Yamaga."

The 2000 release by Manga Entertainment on DVD, which features a commentary track with Hiroyuki Yamaga and Takami Akai, was severely criticized for its poor quality. In 2007, Bandai Visual released a Blu-ray/HD DVD version to mark the film's 20th anniversary; this release used the audio of the 1997 Japanese edition of the film in which its sound effects were re-recorded in Dolby 5.1. Although containing a 20-page booklet with essays by Hiroyuki Yamaga and Ryusuke Hikawa, it lacks the commentary track of the 2000 Manga DVD release, and is now out of print. Maiden Japan re-released the movie separately on Blu-ray and DVD in 2013. In August 2022, Section23 Films announced a concurrent home video release with Bandai Namco Filmworks of a 4K remaster of the film supervised by director Hiroyuki Yamaga, containing as extras the 1987 Japanese production documentary Oneamisu no Tsubasa: Ōritsu Uchūgun—Document File, a version of the pilot film with an alternate audio track, and a collection of the film’s background music. 

The film's initial release in the United Kingdom on VHS in 1995 by Manga Entertainment was cut to remove the attempted rape scene; in a contemporary interview, BBFC examiner Imtiaz Karim indicated this was done voluntarily by Manga, so that the film, which had been certified for audiences 15 and up when shown in UK theaters, could receive the lower PG certificate when released on home video. The 2015 Blu-ray and DVD UK edition of the film from Anime Limited was released uncut with a 15 certificate.

Reception

Critical response in Japan

The Yomiuri Shimbun, Japan's largest daily newspaper, published a mixed review of the film the day before its Japanese premiere, advising readers that, "if what you’re seeking is Top Gun heroic fantasy, you’re not going to get it;" the review took the perspective that rather Hiroyuki Yamaga, as director, writer, and original concept creator, had been attempting with the film "to pour out all the images within his mind into contemporary Japanese society". The newspaper characterized the film as scattered and boring at times, and stated a certain "resentment at its lack of excitement," but concluded by expressing its admiration for the film on the grounds of its effort and expense, honest and personal vision, and for not clinging to the patterns of previous anime works.

Royal Space Force ranked high in major annual retrospectives awarded by the Japanese anime press. The film won the Japan Anime Award for best anime release of 1987, chosen by an industry jury and sponsored by a consortium of magazines including Animedia, OUT, My Anime, The Anime, and Animec. In the Anime Grand Prix fan poll rankings, sponsored by Animage magazine, Royal Space Force made two of the year's top ten lists: voted #4 anime release of 1987, with Shirotsugh Lhadatt as #9 male character, in addition to receiving an Animage Award presented that year by the magazine to the film itself. In 1988, Royal Space Force won the Seiun Award, Japan's oldest prize for science fiction, for Best Dramatic Presentation of the previous year. At the beginning of 1989, the Animage editorial department, writing for Tokuma Shoten's retrospective on the first 70 years of anime film, compared Royal Space Force to Isao Takahata's 1968 The Great Adventure of Horus, Prince of the Sun; just as Horus had suddenly demonstrated a new level of realism and social themes in anime, Animage saw Royal Space Force as a work that also seemed to have emerged onto the scene unrelated to any previous commercial release, "an anime movie with a different methodology and message ... It's uncertain what influence it will have on anime in the future, but what is certain is that this was a work filled with the tremendous passion of its young staff." Hayao Miyazaki, who had been a key animator and scene designer on Takahata's film, would in 1995 himself argue that the staff of Royal Space Force demonstrated it remained possible to make an anime film the way he had helped to make Horus in the 1960s, as part of a crew of "inexperienced amateurs in their mid-20s, who hung out together and ate together, who mingled their work and their personal lives together".

Tetsuo Daitoku, editor of the anime magazine OUT, reviewed Royal Space Force for Japan's oldest film journal, Kinema Junpo, in their March 15, 1987 issue.  Daitoku wrote that he began watching the film wondering why the young creative staff making the film, whom he called "a new kind of people in anime," had chosen to use the "well-worn subject" of space travel, which had already been the focus of such iconic works as Space Battleship Yamato, not to mention live-action films such as The Right Stuff.  Daitoku however found the question in his mind being removed "little by little" as the film progressed: "Yes, human beings have gone beyond this world in the physical sense, and left their footprints up among the stars, but did their conscience and mentality go along with them?" He felt the film acknowledged the issue and therefore took it as "necessary to observe the history and civilization of mankind from [a point] where the whole Earth can be seen ... This motif is the underlying basis of The Wings of Honnêamise. It is clear from the scenes at the end that we are seeing the reality of human history, not [only] that of a different world."  By "taking full advantage of the unique medium of animation," the creators "observe civilization objectively first and then disassemble it to eventually restructure it" ... "creating the different world by newly creating everything," down to the spoons, in the example Daitoku gives. "Stories that feature cool machines, robots, and attractive characters, with the plot unfolding while drifting through space, already reached their peak in a sense with the [1984] Macross movie. Rather than trying to go beyond Macross, I think the creators of this film believed that they could find a new horizon for anime by creating a different world in a way that draws the story closer to Earth again." Daitoku points out Shirotsugh is aware that whatever technology humans invent will be misused, and that Shirotsugh, although with noble intentions, is shown by the film to be less than heroic as a person, asking in conclusion: "What did the windmill mean that this Don Quixote named Shirotsugh Lhadatt went to space to confront, on this Rozinante called a rocket?"

The March 15 issue of Kinema Junpo also featured a conversation on the film between Hiroyuki Yamaga and Hayao Miyazaki. Miyazaki praised Royal Space Force, calling it "an honest work, without any bluff or pretension ... I thought the movie is going to be a great inspiration to the young people working in this industry. They may be intensely divided over whether they like it or not, but either way it's going to serve as a stimulus." Yamaga debated several aspects of the film with Miyazaki, asserting a great difference between their filmmaking approaches. Miyazaki himself characterized a fundamental difference between the settings of his movies and that of Royal Space Force, explaining he thought Yamaga's film was honest because, "sending up a rocket may give the characters meaning in their lives, but you understand very well they live in a world where they'll be caught up by reality again. That's why I make anachronistic [anime] films on purpose." In the OUT roundtable later that year, Okada would also affirm this difference: "People make serious movies trying to give answers. Mr. Miyazaki's stories are good examples. He creates a fictitious world where he can respond, 'this is what's important.' But our generation knows that it doesn't work that way."

In the Kinema Junpo conversation, Miyazaki related the two problems he personally had with Royal Space Force. The first was the rocket itself, which he saw as not unusual enough; for Miyazaki, its appearance detracted from the sense of victory he wished to feel at the end, because it seemed too reminiscent of "big science like NASA". Related to that was his second problem with the film, in that Miyazaki did not find it convincing that the older members of the launch team would have been prepared to stop the countdown and give up after all their years of work, and that it was Shirotsugh who had to rally them to continue: "I didn't think these old guys would ever say, let's quit. Don't you agree? They seemed forced to say that ... Shirotsugh was only riding because he had the physical strength. After all, it wasn't the young people who'd had the passion; I couldn't help but feel that it was the old guys. I thought it was just done for drama." Yamaga did not deny that he wrote the script in a way he thought would appeal to young people, but argued that the clash between generations was not the message of the film. Miyazaki felt that since it was young people like Yamaga who had "actively sown the seeds of improvement [in anime]" with Royal Space Force, it would have been better in the movie if the young told the old, Stand back, old men. Yamaga noted in response that the film showed a reality where neither generation of the Space Force saw their personal visions prevail, as the construction of the rocket and its launch only happened because of support from a government that had a different agenda from their own. "It's not about making a leap, even though from the beginning it seems that way. More than going somewhere new in a physical sense, my aim was to show something worthy in the process."

In a 1996 interview with Hiroki Azuma shortly after the original broadcast of Neon Genesis Evangelion, Hideaki Anno traced his preceding period of despair and sense of creative stagnation back to the commercial failure of Royal Space Force, which had "devastated" him. "The people who watch anime don't want that kind of work. And even among those who don't watch anime, its marketing campaign failed," asserting that his own directorial debut, Gunbuster, was an ironic response to the reception Royal Space Force had received: "Right, so [instead] send into space a robot and a half-naked girl." When Azuma asked if he had been concerned about facing the same personal collapse again with Evangelion, as it also employed the sales appeal of beautiful girls and robots, Anno laughed and said that he liked those things too. During a retrospective three years earlier with Mamoru Oshii and Yuichiro Oguro on  Yoshiyuki Tomino's film Char's Counterattack, Anno had stated he regarded it as sad that he and his generation had no interest in making the kind of anime that would start a new epoch: "We don't have any 'great causes'. We don't have any 'philosophy'. What we have are our 'hobbies'. We get it, we like girls. We get it, we like those kinds of mecha. But that's all we've got." Oshii answered wryly: "Well, that's the thing about epochs; you can't deliberately set out to start a new one, you know."

In their 1993 conversation, Oshii expressed the view that Anno, although he might be capable of doing so, had not yet made such an anime that reflected "the totality of one's self" as a creator, whereas he believed Yamaga had done so on Royal Space Force: "For better or worse, [it's] Yamaga's work." While Oshii felt this totality meant the work necessarily revealed all of Yamaga's shortcomings as well,  and that Oshii "had a lot of problems" with the movie, nevertheless he stated that Royal Space Force had a certain impact on the idea of making an anime film, simply because no one had ever made one like it before: "It's the kind of work that I want to see. There are a lot of people, such as those at Toei or Madhouse, who are making things by refining the techniques we already have, and that's fine ... the question is though, what kind of films are we going to make with these techniques?" When asked by Oguro about what aspect of Royal Space Force he admired most, Oshii replied it was the film's "rejection of drama." "That was clear to me on the very first screening. I watched it several times again afterwards, but the more I saw it, the more I only realized that Yamaga was a man who had no intention of making drama. And I thought that was a very good thing." Oshii explained that he felt it was not necessary for films to be based in a dramatic structure, but that they could instead be used to create a world filled with mood and ideas, contrasting this in a change between his own two films Patlabor: The Movie (1989) and Patlabor 2 (1993); whereas he perceived the first as more of a drama, he saw the second as more of an essay.

Critical response internationally

Critical reaction to the English-dubbed version of the film during its 1994–1995 theatrical release was greatly divided, with reviews differing widely on the film's plot, themes, direction, and designs. The San Jose Mercury News  Stephen Whitty gave a one-star review, writing that the film offered "nothing really original ... nothing's ever really at stake; there's never a resolution because there's never any conflict to begin with ... And there's also the same misogyny that ruins so much 'adult' animation." Whitty also perceived "self-loathing stereotypes" in the character designs: "The only characters who look remotely Japanese are comical or villainous; the hero and heroine have Caucasian features and big, cute, Hello Kitty eyes." A very similar perception was advanced by LA Village View  Sean O'Neill: "nearly all the good guys look white, with big, round, Walter Keane-style eyes, while the villains are sinister Asians, straight out of a WWII-era American movie. Is this an example of Japanese self-loathing, or does it simply underscore the international prevalence of Western standards of beauty?" The Dallas Morning News Scott Bowles had a more fundamental disagreement with the film's approach as an anime, comparing it to attempts to "commercialize punk music" that instead "stripped the music of its anger, vitality and interest ... face it, anime, and the manga (Japanese comic books) that inspire them are pretty scurrilous pop art forms. Filled with perfectly sculpted heroes, large-breasted and often naked women and lots and lots of violence, they're forms best appreciated by 13-year old boys. And in trying to appeal to a broader audience, writer/director Hiroyuki Yamaga has smoothed out anime's rough edges so much that what he's left with is about as interesting as a Formica counter top," recommending instead that audiences see "a far more representative anime,  Fist of the North Star ... Fist has few of the pretensions of Wings and it's driven along with an energy its better-dressed cousin never attains."

More favorable contemporary reviews tended to regard the film as unconventional while nevertheless recommending the film. The Fort Worth Star-Telegram Andy Grieser wrote that the film "blends provocative ideas and visual beauty ... The world of Wings is a bawdy, claustrophobic Sodom reminiscent of the hybrid Japanese-American city in 1982's Blade Runner." F.X. Feeney wrote in LA Weekly, "These strange, outsize pieces fuse and add a feeling of depth that cartoon narratives often don't obtain ... Technical brilliance aside, what gives The Wings of Honnêamise its slow-building power is the love story—a mysterious and credible one." Richard Harrington in The Washington Post viewed its two-hour length as "a bit windy" but also asserted, "Hiroyuki Yamaga's The Wings of Honnêamise is a spectacular example of Japanimation, ambitious and daring in its seamless melding of color, depth and detail." Roger Ebert of the Chicago Sun-Times gave the film three stars out of four, writing: "One of the pleasures of the film is simply enjoying Yamaga's visual imagination, as in a montage at the end, which shows the planet's suffering and turmoil," and remarked on his "offbeat dramatic style" ... "If you're curious about anime, The Wings of Honnêamise, playing for one week at the Music Box, is a good place to start." Chris Jones of The Daily Texan gave it four stars out of five; while describing the film as "really strange," Jones nevertheless urged readers to see the film, writing, "I really liked this film more than any other animation I've seen and more than most other 'real' films. Depth and intelligence are written into it in more ways than words can describe." In the United Kingdom, Jonathan Romney, writing in The Guardian, regarded the film as the standout of an anime festival at London's National Film Theatre: "One film in the season, though, proves that anime can be complex and lyrical as well as exciting. Hiroyuki Yamaga's Wings of Honnêamise ... Creaky dubbing notwithstanding, it beats recent Disney offerings hands down." In Australia, Max Autohead of Hyper magazine rated it 10 out of 10, calling it "a cinematic masterpiece that will pave the way for more" anime of its kind.

Following its initial English-language release in the mid-'90s, later retrospectives on anime have had a positive view of Royal Space Force: The Wings of Honnêamise. In a 1999 issue of Time, former Film Comment editor-in-chief Richard Corliss wrote an outline on the history of anime, listing under the year 1987 the remark, "The Wings of Honnêamise is released, making anime officially an art form." In the 2006 edition of The Anime Encyclopedia, Jonathan Clements and Helen McCarthy characterized the film as "one of the shining examples of how cerebral and intelligent anime can be". Simon Richmond, in 2009's The Rough Guide to Anime, wrote that the film's "reputation has grown over time to the point where it is justly heralded as a classic of the medium". whereas in 2014's Anime, Colin Odell and Michelle Le Blanc described the film as "an example of science-fantasy anime as art-film narrative, combined with a coming-of-age drama that is intelligent and thought-provoking". In a 2017  Paste listing of the 100 best anime movies of all time, Adult Swim senior vice president and on-air creative director Jason DeMarco ranked the film at #11, remarking, "If The Wings of Honnêamise is a 'noble failure,' it's the sort of failure many filmmakers would kill to have on their résumé." During a 2021 interview with the New York Times, science fiction author Ted Chiang, whose Nebula Award-winning "Story of Your Life" was the basis for the Denis Villeneuve movie Arrival, cited Royal Space Force as the single most impressive example of world building in book or film: "I just really was impressed by the way that the animators for that film, they invented an entirely new physical culture for this movie. The movie is not about those things, but they really fleshed out this alternate world just as the backdrop for the story that they wanted to tell."

Themes and analysis

The rhythmic movements of cosmic planets existed before human civilization. We may try to bestow humanistic meanings to the universe, but it is essentially indifferent to us and beyond our interpretations. The history of human civilization teaches us that "purposes" and "missions" are often used as sacrosanct excuses to commit violence. It is accepted as a truism that humans need to fight for some ideal goals to sustain civilization. At one point in [Royal Space Force], an interviewer asks Shirotsugh to talk about the "purpose" (shimei) of his mission. Shirotsugh does not know how to answer this question ... but he is certainly affected by the question. The later part of the movie suggests that Shirotsugh’s adamant ignorance or, say, innocence implies that not having a purpose is his purpose; his mission has a point because it is blatantly useless. In fact, every military man and politician ridicules his mission ... Shirotsugh’s lack of purpose (which also means not having a military force to destroy or to subjugate others) is an oblique political gesture against intrinsically war-driven human civilization, yet he still cannot escape from such a world in turmoil. His prayer at the end of the film means not only his hope for a better future but also his unconditional acceptance of this world.

Royal Space Force attracted a broader academic analysis as early as 1992, when Takashi Murakami referenced the film through Sea Breeze, a work created during his doctoral studies in nihonga at Tokyo University of the Arts. The installation piece was described as "a ring of enormous, 1000-watt mercury spotlights that emitted a powerful blast of heat and blinding light when a roller shutter was raised...Sea Breeze neatly aligned two major threads in Murakami’s practice of the time: the legacy of the war and its attendant ideologies of imperial divinity and the uniqueness of the Japanese people, and a burgeoning fascination with consumer culture and otaku creativity...the circular of lights was based on a close-up of rocket engines firing during a space launch in the anime Royal Space Force: [The] Wings of Honneamise." Hiroyuki Yamaga’s remark on Royal Space Force, "We wanted to create a world, and we wanted to look at it from space" would be quoted as an epigram in the catalog of the 2001–04 exhibition headlined by Murakami, My Reality—Contemporary Art and the Culture of Japanese Animation, by which time Murakami was described as a "pivotal figure" among contemporary artists "inundated with manga and anime—and with concepts of the new Japan, which was wrestling with a sense of self-identity as an increasingly strong part of the modern capitalistic world, yet was tied to a long and distinguished past." A previous Murakami exhibition in 1999 had noted that the artist's "notorious sculpture" My Lonesome Cowboy was "created at the suggestion of Toshio Okada, the [Gainax] animation film producer".

In a March 1992 roundtable discussion with the Japanese arts magazine Bijutsu Techō, Murakami remarked that he "... found it commendable that otaku were dedicated to 'the invention of a new technique, especially through the use of overlooked elements, finding an "empty space" between existing methods of production or criteria for judging works.' He maintained that art must find the same 'empty space' to revolutionize itself." Sea Breeze was "... contained in a square box on wheels...when switched on, the intense heat and dazzling flash of the lights evoke the moment of its launch...Gainax represented, for Murakami, a model of marginalized yet cutting-edge cultural production. Referring to their film was Murakami's homage to Gainax's independent spirit. At the same time, the fact that the burning wheel was contained inside a box signified passion confined within a conventional frame, evoking the failure of Honneamise to present a uniquely Japanese expression as it remained under the influence of Western science-fiction films." Murakami would later assert, two years after its initial debut, that Sea Breeze "does not have any concept. Just an enormous work [whose] ground of art is collapsed," yet in 1999 remarked further of the piece that, "sadly, this indoor artworld spectacle was the closest the Japanese would get to a space program".

Murakami would express a specific historical conception of otaku during a discussion with Toshio Okada conducted for the 2005 exhibition Little Boy: The Arts of Japan's Exploding Subculture, addressing Okada with the premise: "After Japan experienced defeat in World War II, it gave birth to a distinctive phenomenon, which has gradually degenerated into a uniquely Japanese culture ... [you] are at the very center of this otaku culture", further asserting in an essay for the exhibit catalog that therefore "otaku ... all are ultimately defined by their relentless references to a humiliated self". This historical positioning of otaku culture would itself be challenged through an analysis of Royal Space Force by Viktor Eikman, who cites Murakami's statement in the same essay that the anime studio that made the film occupied "a central place in the current anime world... [they were] professionally incorporated as Gainax in 1984 upon production of the feature-length anime The Wings of Honneamise (released in 1987)" but that the two Gainax works discussed by Murakami in his theory of otaku were the Daicon IV Opening Animation and Neon Genesis Evangelion. Eikman argues that the theory should be tested also against "other works by the same studio, made by the same people for the same audience, but not analysed [in the essay] by Murakami". Of Royal Space Force, Eikman contended, "At most we may view the humiliated Shiro’s mission as symbolic of Japan’s desire to join the Space Race in particular and the 'big boy' struggles of the Cold War in general, a desire which plays into the sense of childish impotence described by Murakami, but even that is a very speculative hypothesis," arguing that "it is remarkably hard to find parallels to World War II" in the film. Eikman proposes a possible "weak analogy" in Royal Space Force to the Japanese attack on Pearl Harbor through the theory of an opposing nation being permitted to attack the launch site in order to provide a casus belli, but suggests such an analogy would "inappropriately cast Shiro as an American".

In 2004's The Cinema Effect, a historical survey examining film through "the question of temporality", Sean Cubitt presents an argument grouping Royal Space Force together with Vidhu Vinod Chopra’s 1942: A Love Story and Tsui Hark’s Once Upon a Time in China as examples of "revisionary" films, distinct from "revisionist" works in that they "do not so much revise [their] history as revision it, look into it with a new mode of envisioning the relationship between the past and the present ... they displace the fate of the present, opening instead a vista onto an elsewhere...ready to forsake the Western ideal of realism [for] the possibility of understanding how they might remake the past and so make the present other than it is." Cubitt proposes that in Royal Space Force "the future emerges as an alternative past ... the film envisions [a country of] lamplighters and steam trains, trams, and prop-driven warplanes, a universe that the Meiji modernization ... might have arrived at had it not been urged along other routes by its exposure to Western technology." A diegesis structured between town and country is seen by Cubitt in the persons of Shiro and Riquinni and their evocation of the "urban-rural continuum" present in Japan's particular experience of modernization, dependent upon "the mythic standing of rice as the medium of 'commensality,' of sharing, hospitality, connection to the gods, the environment, and the cycles of sexual reproduction. In the imaginary country of Honnêamise, the humble bowl of 'terish' seems to work in the same way, a dish whose origin is not clarified in a brief shot of harvesting what might be wheat or millet. The offering and sharing of food brings the stranger into the community in a way that idle urban drinking and gambling cannot."

Cubitt, like Murakami, references the historical consequences of World War II, but in citing a speech by Japan's first postwar prime minister Naruhiko Higashikuni on the need for "nationwide collective repentance," suggests that such repentance is "the theme that seems to resonate in the curious, slow budding" of Royal Space Force through Riquinni's "homemade religion of renunciation and impending judgment" arguing that such a philosophy is evoked also through the film's animation style: "Often a minor fluctuation is all there is to denote the atmosphere or emotion of a scene ... The appeal to a sophisticated audience's ability to decipher these small motions grows into an overall impression of lassitude before a world and a life well worth renouncing" and that "the two major action sequences, the chase and death of the assassin and the launch sequence, cut in the frame, the edit and the construction of depth, but they resolve into the absolute indifference of movements in equilibrium. Like the zero of the Lumières' flickering views, the action of [Royal Space Force] sums at nothingness, a zero degree of the political that removes its resolution from history, and from time itself, into the atemporal zone denoted by Shirotsugh's orbit ... an empty place from which alone the strife of warfare and suffering sinks into pure regret, not so much an  end as an exit from history."

In contrast, Shu Kuge, in a 2007 essay in the journal Mechademia, sees Shiro's position in space at film's end as "not the denial of history but the empathetic move to accept the cruel world without translating it into a metaphysical meaning". Kuge groups the connection between Shiro and Riquinni with that between Mikako Nagamine and Noboru Terao in Makoto Shinkai's Voices of a Distant Star as examples of a personal connection that, although under different circumstances in each story, is in either case a relationship sustained by the spatial distance between two people: "[they] sustain the distance rather than shrink it because sustaining ... is crucial for their relationships to be vast and generous. The topological relationship between the floating and the remaining is actually a mimesis of a stellar relationship, such as the moon and the earth, the earth and the sun. Repetitive references to 'stars' in these movies should not be understood as metaphors; the characters in these anime aspire to become stars in space so as to overcome human dimensions..." Kuge suggests a mutual personal attraction is indeed present between Riquinni and Shiro, but that "Riquinni maintains distance from Shirotsugh and leaves herself as an object of desire somewhat obscure, probably because she fears that physical proximity as well as the clarity of her interest diminishes a certain degree of her and his curiosity in their relationship. It is not that she is a tease, but she seems to know that ongoing curiosity, a drive toward the unknown, makes life more valuable; therefore, they can take care of each other better. In other words, the unknown should be sustained. Spatially speaking, curiosity is possible when the contact of the two bodies is suspended."

Kuge further asserts "... They 'communicate' best when they have a physical distance between them...Shirotsugh visits Riquinni the day before he leaves for his mission, but she is not at home. He then hops into a trolley car, and Riquinni almost simultaneously steps out from the same car. She turns and recognizes Shirotsugh on board. They do not talk, but she smiles at him. As the trolley car
slowly begins to move, Shirotsugh smiles back, saying 'Ittekimasu,' which literally means 'I am going,' a greeting that can be uttered only between family members and close friends. This scene lasts for less than thirty seconds, yet it demonstrates effectively and poetically what their relationship is. The physical distance between these two people connects them and sustains them in a particular continuity, although they appear not to share the same space. The same continuity also preserves the erotic energy between them. Collapsing this distance can mean the end of their relationship." Noting the struggle between the armed forces of Honnêamise and the Republic to control the same physical territory, Kuge comments that by contrast the Royal Space Force does not in fact "possess any military force," and suggests that likewise the personal nature of Shiro and Riquinni's relationship depends upon respecting the physical separation and boundaries that she seeks to maintain and which he seeks to violate, and does violate, before they are reaffirmed in the latter part of the film. "It is not a coincidence that Shirotsugh's enthusiasm for space arises right after he meets Riquinni, who promotes the world of
mythos that preserves the unknown (because it does not inquire about the 'essence' of all that is), instead of that of logos, or logical reasoning, which rationalizes physical phenomena. As she sustains her distance from him, his curiosity toward her is also transposed to an unknown territory, that is, outer space. When Shirotsugh reaches the unknown, there is no physical contact. All he can do is float. He seems to realize that the world indeed has no boundaries; in fact, he can float in this one continuous spatiality that includes everything. Being sustained by this vast distance, Shirotsugh prays, as if it were the only way to tell others the grandeur of this world."

Sequel

During 1992–93, Gainax developed plans for a sequel to Royal Space Force to be entitled Aoki Uru (also known under the titles Uru in Blue and Blue Uru); an anime film project to be directed by Hideaki Anno and scripted by Hiroyuki Yamaga, with Yoshiyuki Sadamoto serving as its chief animation director and character designer. Although a full storyboard, partial script, and an extensive collection of design illustrations were produced for Aoki Uru, the project had been initiated without a secured budget, and its development occurred within a period of personal, financial, and managerial crises at Gainax that contributed to the indefinite suspension of work on Aoki Uru in July 1993; the studio instead shifted to producing as their next anime project the TV series Neon Genesis Evangelion. In the years following 1993, Gainax has made occasional announcements regarding a revival of the Aoki Uru concept, including a multimedia proposal in the late 1990s, and the formal announcement of an English name for the film, Uru in Blue, at the 2013 Tokyo Anime Fair. In 2018, the Uru in Blue project was transferred from Gainax to Gaina, a different corporate entity and subsidiary of the Kinoshita Group, with the aim of a worldwide release of the film in 2022.

See also
 List of animated feature films

Notes

References

Citations

External links

   (archived English homepage)
 
 
 
 Entry in The Encyclopedia of Science Fiction

1987 films
1987 anime films
1987 drama films
1980s science fiction drama films
Anime with original screenplays
Bandai Visual
Drama anime and manga
Films about space programs
Films about rape
Films directed by Hiroyuki Yamaga
Films scored by Ryuichi Sakamoto
Films scored by Yuji Nomi
Films set in a fictional country
Films set on fictional planets
Gainax
Japanese aviation films
Japanese animated science fiction films
1980s Japanese-language films
Maiden Japan
Toho animated films